

137001–137100 

|-bgcolor=#fefefe
| 137001 ||  || — || September 26, 1998 || Socorro || LINEAR || — || align=right | 1.4 km || 
|-id=002 bgcolor=#fefefe
| 137002 ||  || — || September 26, 1998 || Socorro || LINEAR || — || align=right | 2.0 km || 
|-id=003 bgcolor=#fefefe
| 137003 ||  || — || September 26, 1998 || Socorro || LINEAR || — || align=right | 1.3 km || 
|-id=004 bgcolor=#E9E9E9
| 137004 ||  || — || September 26, 1998 || Socorro || LINEAR || EUN || align=right | 1.4 km || 
|-id=005 bgcolor=#fefefe
| 137005 ||  || — || September 26, 1998 || Socorro || LINEAR || MAS || align=right | 1.2 km || 
|-id=006 bgcolor=#E9E9E9
| 137006 ||  || — || September 26, 1998 || Socorro || LINEAR || — || align=right | 1.8 km || 
|-id=007 bgcolor=#fefefe
| 137007 ||  || — || September 26, 1998 || Socorro || LINEAR || — || align=right | 2.0 km || 
|-id=008 bgcolor=#E9E9E9
| 137008 ||  || — || September 26, 1998 || Socorro || LINEAR || — || align=right | 1.7 km || 
|-id=009 bgcolor=#E9E9E9
| 137009 ||  || — || September 26, 1998 || Socorro || LINEAR || — || align=right | 3.1 km || 
|-id=010 bgcolor=#E9E9E9
| 137010 ||  || — || September 26, 1998 || Socorro || LINEAR || — || align=right | 1.6 km || 
|-id=011 bgcolor=#d6d6d6
| 137011 ||  || — || September 26, 1998 || Socorro || LINEAR || Tj (2.95) || align=right | 11 km || 
|-id=012 bgcolor=#E9E9E9
| 137012 ||  || — || September 26, 1998 || Socorro || LINEAR || — || align=right | 1.4 km || 
|-id=013 bgcolor=#E9E9E9
| 137013 ||  || — || September 26, 1998 || Socorro || LINEAR || — || align=right | 1.6 km || 
|-id=014 bgcolor=#d6d6d6
| 137014 ||  || — || September 26, 1998 || Socorro || LINEAR || 3:2 || align=right | 8.2 km || 
|-id=015 bgcolor=#d6d6d6
| 137015 ||  || — || September 26, 1998 || Socorro || LINEAR || Tj (2.96) || align=right | 7.8 km || 
|-id=016 bgcolor=#E9E9E9
| 137016 ||  || — || September 26, 1998 || Socorro || LINEAR || — || align=right | 1.7 km || 
|-id=017 bgcolor=#E9E9E9
| 137017 ||  || — || September 26, 1998 || Socorro || LINEAR || — || align=right | 2.2 km || 
|-id=018 bgcolor=#E9E9E9
| 137018 ||  || — || September 26, 1998 || Socorro || LINEAR || — || align=right | 1.6 km || 
|-id=019 bgcolor=#E9E9E9
| 137019 ||  || — || September 16, 1998 || Anderson Mesa || LONEOS || — || align=right | 2.0 km || 
|-id=020 bgcolor=#E9E9E9
| 137020 || 1998 TL || — || October 10, 1998 || Oizumi || T. Kobayashi || — || align=right | 1.8 km || 
|-id=021 bgcolor=#E9E9E9
| 137021 ||  || — || October 13, 1998 || Caussols || ODAS || — || align=right | 1.8 km || 
|-id=022 bgcolor=#fefefe
| 137022 ||  || — || October 14, 1998 || Socorro || LINEAR || H || align=right | 1.9 km || 
|-id=023 bgcolor=#E9E9E9
| 137023 ||  || — || October 14, 1998 || Kitt Peak || Spacewatch || — || align=right | 2.7 km || 
|-id=024 bgcolor=#fefefe
| 137024 ||  || — || October 14, 1998 || Kitt Peak || Spacewatch || MAS || align=right | 1.0 km || 
|-id=025 bgcolor=#E9E9E9
| 137025 ||  || — || October 15, 1998 || Caussols || ODAS || — || align=right | 1.8 km || 
|-id=026 bgcolor=#E9E9E9
| 137026 ||  || — || October 14, 1998 || Caussols || ODAS || — || align=right | 1.5 km || 
|-id=027 bgcolor=#fefefe
| 137027 ||  || — || October 15, 1998 || Caussols || ODAS || NYS || align=right | 1.0 km || 
|-id=028 bgcolor=#E9E9E9
| 137028 ||  || — || October 15, 1998 || Caussols || ODAS || — || align=right | 3.6 km || 
|-id=029 bgcolor=#E9E9E9
| 137029 ||  || — || October 14, 1998 || Xinglong || SCAP || — || align=right | 1.2 km || 
|-id=030 bgcolor=#fefefe
| 137030 ||  || — || October 15, 1998 || Xinglong || SCAP || H || align=right | 1.0 km || 
|-id=031 bgcolor=#E9E9E9
| 137031 ||  || — || October 13, 1998 || Kitt Peak || Spacewatch || — || align=right | 1.7 km || 
|-id=032 bgcolor=#FFC2E0
| 137032 ||  || — || October 19, 1998 || Socorro || LINEAR || APO +1km || align=right | 1.1 km || 
|-id=033 bgcolor=#E9E9E9
| 137033 ||  || — || October 21, 1998 || Kleť || Kleť Obs. || — || align=right | 2.6 km || 
|-id=034 bgcolor=#fefefe
| 137034 ||  || — || October 23, 1998 || Kitt Peak || Spacewatch || NYS || align=right | 1.5 km || 
|-id=035 bgcolor=#fefefe
| 137035 ||  || — || October 17, 1998 || Xinglong || SCAP || V || align=right | 1.7 km || 
|-id=036 bgcolor=#fefefe
| 137036 ||  || — || October 19, 1998 || Xinglong || SCAP || — || align=right | 1.5 km || 
|-id=037 bgcolor=#fefefe
| 137037 ||  || — || October 28, 1998 || Socorro || LINEAR || H || align=right data-sort-value="0.88" | 880 m || 
|-id=038 bgcolor=#E9E9E9
| 137038 ||  || — || October 18, 1998 || La Silla || E. W. Elst || — || align=right | 1.6 km || 
|-id=039 bgcolor=#E9E9E9
| 137039 Lisiguang ||  ||  || October 26, 1998 || Xinglong || SCAP || — || align=right | 3.3 km || 
|-id=040 bgcolor=#fefefe
| 137040 ||  || — || October 28, 1998 || Socorro || LINEAR || NYS || align=right | 1.5 km || 
|-id=041 bgcolor=#E9E9E9
| 137041 ||  || — || October 28, 1998 || Socorro || LINEAR || — || align=right | 2.5 km || 
|-id=042 bgcolor=#fefefe
| 137042 ||  || — || October 24, 1998 || Kitt Peak || Spacewatch || NYS || align=right | 1.5 km || 
|-id=043 bgcolor=#E9E9E9
| 137043 ||  || — || October 23, 1998 || Caussols || ODAS || — || align=right | 1.3 km || 
|-id=044 bgcolor=#FFC2E0
| 137044 ||  || — || October 29, 1998 || Socorro || LINEAR || AMO +1km || align=right | 1.7 km || 
|-id=045 bgcolor=#fefefe
| 137045 || 1998 VE || — || November 7, 1998 || Gekko || T. Kagawa || NYS || align=right | 1.7 km || 
|-id=046 bgcolor=#E9E9E9
| 137046 ||  || — || November 11, 1998 || Nachi-Katsuura || Y. Shimizu, T. Urata || — || align=right | 4.4 km || 
|-id=047 bgcolor=#E9E9E9
| 137047 ||  || — || November 10, 1998 || Socorro || LINEAR || — || align=right | 1.9 km || 
|-id=048 bgcolor=#E9E9E9
| 137048 ||  || — || November 10, 1998 || Socorro || LINEAR || — || align=right | 1.7 km || 
|-id=049 bgcolor=#E9E9E9
| 137049 ||  || — || November 10, 1998 || Socorro || LINEAR || — || align=right | 2.3 km || 
|-id=050 bgcolor=#E9E9E9
| 137050 ||  || — || November 10, 1998 || Socorro || LINEAR || MIT || align=right | 3.0 km || 
|-id=051 bgcolor=#E9E9E9
| 137051 ||  || — || November 10, 1998 || Socorro || LINEAR || EUN || align=right | 2.0 km || 
|-id=052 bgcolor=#FFC2E0
| 137052 Tjelvar ||  ||  || November 15, 1998 || La Silla || C.-I. Lagerkvist || APO +1km || align=right | 1.4 km || 
|-id=053 bgcolor=#fefefe
| 137053 ||  || — || November 11, 1998 || Socorro || LINEAR || H || align=right data-sort-value="0.92" | 920 m || 
|-id=054 bgcolor=#E9E9E9
| 137054 ||  || — || November 11, 1998 || Caussols || ODAS || — || align=right | 1.9 km || 
|-id=055 bgcolor=#E9E9E9
| 137055 ||  || — || November 14, 1998 || Socorro || LINEAR || EUN || align=right | 1.8 km || 
|-id=056 bgcolor=#E9E9E9
| 137056 ||  || — || November 15, 1998 || Kitt Peak || Spacewatch || — || align=right | 3.4 km || 
|-id=057 bgcolor=#fefefe
| 137057 ||  || — || November 14, 1998 || Anderson Mesa || LONEOS || H || align=right | 1.0 km || 
|-id=058 bgcolor=#E9E9E9
| 137058 ||  || — || November 10, 1998 || Anderson Mesa || LONEOS || — || align=right | 1.7 km || 
|-id=059 bgcolor=#fefefe
| 137059 ||  || — || November 11, 1998 || Xinglong || SCAP || — || align=right | 1.9 km || 
|-id=060 bgcolor=#E9E9E9
| 137060 ||  || — || November 11, 1998 || Socorro || LINEAR || — || align=right | 2.3 km || 
|-id=061 bgcolor=#fefefe
| 137061 ||  || — || November 11, 1998 || Socorro || LINEAR || — || align=right | 1.5 km || 
|-id=062 bgcolor=#FFC2E0
| 137062 || 1998 WM || — || November 16, 1998 || Socorro || LINEAR || APO +1km || align=right | 1.3 km || 
|-id=063 bgcolor=#E9E9E9
| 137063 ||  || — || November 16, 1998 || Monte Agliale || S. Donati || — || align=right | 3.4 km || 
|-id=064 bgcolor=#FFC2E0
| 137064 ||  || — || November 19, 1998 || Socorro || LINEAR || AMO || align=right data-sort-value="0.59" | 590 m || 
|-id=065 bgcolor=#E9E9E9
| 137065 ||  || — || November 21, 1998 || Socorro || LINEAR || slow || align=right | 1.9 km || 
|-id=066 bgcolor=#fefefe
| 137066 Gellért-hegy ||  ||  || November 23, 1998 || Piszkéstető || K. Sárneczky, L. Kiss || H || align=right data-sort-value="0.75" | 750 m || 
|-id=067 bgcolor=#E9E9E9
| 137067 ||  || — || November 28, 1998 || Višnjan Observatory || K. Korlević || — || align=right | 2.1 km || 
|-id=068 bgcolor=#E9E9E9
| 137068 ||  || — || November 21, 1998 || Socorro || LINEAR || — || align=right | 2.1 km || 
|-id=069 bgcolor=#FA8072
| 137069 ||  || — || November 21, 1998 || Socorro || LINEAR || — || align=right | 1.8 km || 
|-id=070 bgcolor=#E9E9E9
| 137070 ||  || — || November 18, 1998 || Socorro || LINEAR || — || align=right | 2.8 km || 
|-id=071 bgcolor=#E9E9E9
| 137071 ||  || — || November 23, 1998 || Kitt Peak || Spacewatch || — || align=right | 1.6 km || 
|-id=072 bgcolor=#E9E9E9
| 137072 ||  || — || November 26, 1998 || Kitt Peak || Spacewatch || — || align=right | 2.3 km || 
|-id=073 bgcolor=#fefefe
| 137073 ||  || — || November 20, 1998 || Anderson Mesa || LONEOS || NYS || align=right | 1.9 km || 
|-id=074 bgcolor=#fefefe
| 137074 ||  || — || November 16, 1998 || Kitt Peak || Spacewatch || — || align=right | 1.2 km || 
|-id=075 bgcolor=#E9E9E9
| 137075 ||  || — || November 21, 1998 || Kitt Peak || Spacewatch || — || align=right | 2.1 km || 
|-id=076 bgcolor=#E9E9E9
| 137076 ||  || — || December 10, 1998 || Ondřejov || L. Kotková || — || align=right | 4.9 km || 
|-id=077 bgcolor=#fefefe
| 137077 ||  || — || December 8, 1998 || Kitt Peak || Spacewatch || NYS || align=right | 1.3 km || 
|-id=078 bgcolor=#FFC2E0
| 137078 ||  || — || December 11, 1998 || Socorro || LINEAR || APO +1km || align=right | 1.9 km || 
|-id=079 bgcolor=#E9E9E9
| 137079 ||  || — || December 9, 1998 || Farra d'Isonzo || Farra d'Isonzo || — || align=right | 2.4 km || 
|-id=080 bgcolor=#fefefe
| 137080 ||  || — || December 8, 1998 || Kitt Peak || Spacewatch || V || align=right | 1.6 km || 
|-id=081 bgcolor=#E9E9E9
| 137081 ||  || — || December 8, 1998 || Kitt Peak || Spacewatch || — || align=right | 4.7 km || 
|-id=082 bgcolor=#E9E9E9
| 137082 Maurobachini ||  ||  || December 12, 1998 || San Marcello || L. Tesi, G. Forti || — || align=right | 2.9 km || 
|-id=083 bgcolor=#E9E9E9
| 137083 ||  || — || December 15, 1998 || Caussols || ODAS || — || align=right | 1.8 km || 
|-id=084 bgcolor=#FFC2E0
| 137084 ||  || — || December 15, 1998 || Socorro || LINEAR || APO +1km || align=right | 1.2 km || 
|-id=085 bgcolor=#E9E9E9
| 137085 ||  || — || December 8, 1998 || Kitt Peak || Spacewatch || — || align=right | 2.6 km || 
|-id=086 bgcolor=#E9E9E9
| 137086 ||  || — || December 10, 1998 || Kitt Peak || Spacewatch || — || align=right | 2.5 km || 
|-id=087 bgcolor=#E9E9E9
| 137087 ||  || — || December 10, 1998 || Kitt Peak || Spacewatch || — || align=right | 1.7 km || 
|-id=088 bgcolor=#fefefe
| 137088 ||  || — || December 11, 1998 || Kitt Peak || Spacewatch || NYS || align=right | 1.2 km || 
|-id=089 bgcolor=#E9E9E9
| 137089 ||  || — || December 14, 1998 || Socorro || LINEAR || — || align=right | 3.4 km || 
|-id=090 bgcolor=#fefefe
| 137090 ||  || — || December 15, 1998 || Socorro || LINEAR || — || align=right | 2.2 km || 
|-id=091 bgcolor=#E9E9E9
| 137091 ||  || — || December 14, 1998 || Socorro || LINEAR || — || align=right | 4.0 km || 
|-id=092 bgcolor=#E9E9E9
| 137092 ||  || — || December 14, 1998 || Socorro || LINEAR || MIT || align=right | 4.2 km || 
|-id=093 bgcolor=#E9E9E9
| 137093 ||  || — || December 14, 1998 || Socorro || LINEAR || — || align=right | 1.9 km || 
|-id=094 bgcolor=#E9E9E9
| 137094 ||  || — || December 15, 1998 || Socorro || LINEAR || — || align=right | 3.4 km || 
|-id=095 bgcolor=#E9E9E9
| 137095 ||  || — || December 15, 1998 || Socorro || LINEAR || — || align=right | 3.8 km || 
|-id=096 bgcolor=#E9E9E9
| 137096 ||  || — || December 11, 1998 || Mérida || O. A. Naranjo || NEM || align=right | 3.2 km || 
|-id=097 bgcolor=#E9E9E9
| 137097 ||  || — || December 8, 1998 || Anderson Mesa || LONEOS || RAF || align=right | 2.0 km || 
|-id=098 bgcolor=#E9E9E9
| 137098 ||  || — || December 17, 1998 || Caussols || ODAS || — || align=right | 3.5 km || 
|-id=099 bgcolor=#FFC2E0
| 137099 ||  || — || December 17, 1998 || Socorro || LINEAR || APO || align=right data-sort-value="0.56" | 560 m || 
|-id=100 bgcolor=#E9E9E9
| 137100 ||  || — || December 23, 1998 || Brainerd || J. Wentworth || — || align=right | 3.9 km || 
|}

137101–137200 

|-bgcolor=#E9E9E9
| 137101 ||  || — || December 22, 1998 || Kitt Peak || Spacewatch || — || align=right | 1.7 km || 
|-id=102 bgcolor=#fefefe
| 137102 ||  || — || December 25, 1998 || Kitt Peak || Spacewatch || — || align=right | 1.8 km || 
|-id=103 bgcolor=#E9E9E9
| 137103 ||  || — || December 27, 1998 || Anderson Mesa || LONEOS || — || align=right | 4.1 km || 
|-id=104 bgcolor=#E9E9E9
| 137104 ||  || — || December 16, 1998 || Anderson Mesa || LONEOS || — || align=right | 1.9 km || 
|-id=105 bgcolor=#E9E9E9
| 137105 ||  || — || December 22, 1998 || Kitt Peak || Spacewatch || — || align=right | 2.1 km || 
|-id=106 bgcolor=#E9E9E9
| 137106 ||  || — || January 12, 1999 || Oizumi || T. Kobayashi || — || align=right | 2.0 km || 
|-id=107 bgcolor=#E9E9E9
| 137107 ||  || — || January 9, 1999 || Višnjan Observatory || K. Korlević || — || align=right | 2.8 km || 
|-id=108 bgcolor=#FFC2E0
| 137108 ||  || — || January 13, 1999 || Socorro || LINEAR || APO +1kmPHA || align=right data-sort-value="0.86" | 860 m || 
|-id=109 bgcolor=#E9E9E9
| 137109 ||  || — || January 7, 1999 || Kitt Peak || Spacewatch || — || align=right | 1.6 km || 
|-id=110 bgcolor=#E9E9E9
| 137110 ||  || — || January 7, 1999 || Kitt Peak || Spacewatch || — || align=right | 2.8 km || 
|-id=111 bgcolor=#E9E9E9
| 137111 ||  || — || January 13, 1999 || Kitt Peak || Spacewatch || HOF || align=right | 3.7 km || 
|-id=112 bgcolor=#E9E9E9
| 137112 ||  || — || January 13, 1999 || Kitt Peak || Spacewatch || — || align=right | 2.5 km || 
|-id=113 bgcolor=#E9E9E9
| 137113 ||  || — || January 13, 1999 || Kitt Peak || Spacewatch || — || align=right | 3.8 km || 
|-id=114 bgcolor=#E9E9E9
| 137114 ||  || — || January 15, 1999 || Caussols || ODAS || — || align=right | 2.2 km || 
|-id=115 bgcolor=#E9E9E9
| 137115 ||  || — || January 14, 1999 || Kitt Peak || Spacewatch || — || align=right | 3.8 km || 
|-id=116 bgcolor=#E9E9E9
| 137116 ||  || — || January 19, 1999 || Caussols || ODAS || — || align=right | 3.2 km || 
|-id=117 bgcolor=#E9E9E9
| 137117 ||  || — || January 19, 1999 || San Marcello || A. Boattini, L. Tesi || — || align=right | 4.1 km || 
|-id=118 bgcolor=#E9E9E9
| 137118 ||  || — || January 19, 1999 || Caussols || ODAS || EUN || align=right | 2.5 km || 
|-id=119 bgcolor=#E9E9E9
| 137119 ||  || — || January 21, 1999 || Caussols || ODAS || — || align=right | 4.5 km || 
|-id=120 bgcolor=#FFC2E0
| 137120 ||  || — || January 20, 1999 || Catalina || CSS || APO +1kmPHA || align=right data-sort-value="0.82" | 820 m || 
|-id=121 bgcolor=#E9E9E9
| 137121 ||  || — || January 20, 1999 || Caussols || ODAS || XIZ || align=right | 2.4 km || 
|-id=122 bgcolor=#E9E9E9
| 137122 ||  || — || January 24, 1999 || Višnjan Observatory || K. Korlević || — || align=right | 1.8 km || 
|-id=123 bgcolor=#E9E9E9
| 137123 ||  || — || January 18, 1999 || Socorro || LINEAR || — || align=right | 5.2 km || 
|-id=124 bgcolor=#E9E9E9
| 137124 ||  || — || January 19, 1999 || Kitt Peak || Spacewatch || — || align=right | 3.9 km || 
|-id=125 bgcolor=#FFC2E0
| 137125 ||  || — || February 10, 1999 || Socorro || LINEAR || AMO || align=right data-sort-value="0.65" | 650 m || 
|-id=126 bgcolor=#FFC2E0
| 137126 ||  || — || February 12, 1999 || Socorro || LINEAR || APO +1kmPHA || align=right data-sort-value="0.88" | 880 m || 
|-id=127 bgcolor=#E9E9E9
| 137127 ||  || — || February 10, 1999 || Socorro || LINEAR || — || align=right | 2.7 km || 
|-id=128 bgcolor=#E9E9E9
| 137128 ||  || — || February 10, 1999 || Socorro || LINEAR || MRX || align=right | 2.4 km || 
|-id=129 bgcolor=#E9E9E9
| 137129 ||  || — || February 10, 1999 || Socorro || LINEAR || MIS || align=right | 4.7 km || 
|-id=130 bgcolor=#E9E9E9
| 137130 ||  || — || February 10, 1999 || Socorro || LINEAR || HNA || align=right | 4.3 km || 
|-id=131 bgcolor=#E9E9E9
| 137131 ||  || — || February 10, 1999 || Socorro || LINEAR || — || align=right | 2.0 km || 
|-id=132 bgcolor=#E9E9E9
| 137132 ||  || — || February 10, 1999 || Socorro || LINEAR || — || align=right | 3.1 km || 
|-id=133 bgcolor=#E9E9E9
| 137133 ||  || — || February 10, 1999 || Socorro || LINEAR || — || align=right | 5.0 km || 
|-id=134 bgcolor=#E9E9E9
| 137134 ||  || — || February 12, 1999 || Socorro || LINEAR || MIS || align=right | 2.9 km || 
|-id=135 bgcolor=#E9E9E9
| 137135 ||  || — || February 12, 1999 || Socorro || LINEAR || — || align=right | 4.2 km || 
|-id=136 bgcolor=#E9E9E9
| 137136 ||  || — || February 10, 1999 || Socorro || LINEAR || — || align=right | 3.1 km || 
|-id=137 bgcolor=#E9E9E9
| 137137 ||  || — || February 10, 1999 || Socorro || LINEAR || — || align=right | 3.7 km || 
|-id=138 bgcolor=#E9E9E9
| 137138 ||  || — || February 10, 1999 || Socorro || LINEAR || — || align=right | 4.1 km || 
|-id=139 bgcolor=#E9E9E9
| 137139 ||  || — || February 10, 1999 || Socorro || LINEAR || — || align=right | 1.9 km || 
|-id=140 bgcolor=#E9E9E9
| 137140 ||  || — || February 12, 1999 || Socorro || LINEAR || — || align=right | 3.4 km || 
|-id=141 bgcolor=#E9E9E9
| 137141 ||  || — || February 12, 1999 || Socorro || LINEAR || — || align=right | 3.6 km || 
|-id=142 bgcolor=#E9E9E9
| 137142 ||  || — || February 12, 1999 || Socorro || LINEAR || — || align=right | 3.7 km || 
|-id=143 bgcolor=#E9E9E9
| 137143 ||  || — || February 12, 1999 || Socorro || LINEAR || DOR || align=right | 5.0 km || 
|-id=144 bgcolor=#E9E9E9
| 137144 ||  || — || February 12, 1999 || Socorro || LINEAR || — || align=right | 4.0 km || 
|-id=145 bgcolor=#E9E9E9
| 137145 ||  || — || February 7, 1999 || Kitt Peak || Spacewatch || — || align=right | 3.6 km || 
|-id=146 bgcolor=#d6d6d6
| 137146 ||  || — || February 8, 1999 || Kitt Peak || Spacewatch || — || align=right | 5.2 km || 
|-id=147 bgcolor=#d6d6d6
| 137147 ||  || — || February 8, 1999 || Kitt Peak || Spacewatch || — || align=right | 4.7 km || 
|-id=148 bgcolor=#d6d6d6
| 137148 ||  || — || February 9, 1999 || Kitt Peak || Spacewatch || — || align=right | 4.9 km || 
|-id=149 bgcolor=#E9E9E9
| 137149 ||  || — || February 9, 1999 || Kitt Peak || Spacewatch || — || align=right | 5.3 km || 
|-id=150 bgcolor=#E9E9E9
| 137150 ||  || — || February 12, 1999 || Anderson Mesa || LONEOS || — || align=right | 4.8 km || 
|-id=151 bgcolor=#E9E9E9
| 137151 || 1999 DO || — || February 16, 1999 || Caussols || ODAS || — || align=right | 4.7 km || 
|-id=152 bgcolor=#E9E9E9
| 137152 ||  || — || February 17, 1999 || Socorro || LINEAR || — || align=right | 2.9 km || 
|-id=153 bgcolor=#E9E9E9
| 137153 || 1999 EC || — || March 6, 1999 || Prescott || P. G. Comba || PAD || align=right | 3.6 km || 
|-id=154 bgcolor=#fefefe
| 137154 || 1999 EN || — || March 6, 1999 || Kitt Peak || Spacewatch || — || align=right | 1.0 km || 
|-id=155 bgcolor=#fefefe
| 137155 ||  || — || March 12, 1999 || Kitt Peak || Spacewatch || NYS || align=right data-sort-value="0.68" | 680 m || 
|-id=156 bgcolor=#E9E9E9
| 137156 ||  || — || March 12, 1999 || Kitt Peak || Spacewatch || — || align=right | 1.5 km || 
|-id=157 bgcolor=#E9E9E9
| 137157 ||  || — || March 14, 1999 || Kitt Peak || Spacewatch || — || align=right | 2.7 km || 
|-id=158 bgcolor=#FFC2E0
| 137158 || 1999 FB || — || March 16, 1999 || Socorro || LINEAR || APO +1km || align=right data-sort-value="0.93" | 930 m || 
|-id=159 bgcolor=#d6d6d6
| 137159 ||  || — || March 16, 1999 || Kitt Peak || Spacewatch || KOR || align=right | 2.5 km || 
|-id=160 bgcolor=#E9E9E9
| 137160 ||  || — || March 19, 1999 || Socorro || LINEAR || — || align=right | 5.0 km || 
|-id=161 bgcolor=#d6d6d6
| 137161 ||  || — || March 19, 1999 || Socorro || LINEAR || — || align=right | 5.3 km || 
|-id=162 bgcolor=#E9E9E9
| 137162 ||  || — || March 20, 1999 || Socorro || LINEAR || — || align=right | 3.9 km || 
|-id=163 bgcolor=#E9E9E9
| 137163 ||  || — || March 20, 1999 || Socorro || LINEAR || — || align=right | 3.6 km || 
|-id=164 bgcolor=#d6d6d6
| 137164 ||  || — || March 20, 1999 || Socorro || LINEAR || — || align=right | 5.1 km || 
|-id=165 bgcolor=#d6d6d6
| 137165 Annis ||  ||  || March 20, 1999 || Apache Point || SDSS || — || align=right | 3.8 km || 
|-id=166 bgcolor=#d6d6d6
| 137166 Netabahcall ||  ||  || March 20, 1999 || Apache Point || SDSS || — || align=right | 2.9 km || 
|-id=167 bgcolor=#d6d6d6
| 137167 ||  || — || April 7, 1999 || Kitt Peak || Spacewatch || — || align=right | 3.3 km || 
|-id=168 bgcolor=#d6d6d6
| 137168 ||  || — || April 7, 1999 || Kitt Peak || Spacewatch || — || align=right | 4.7 km || 
|-id=169 bgcolor=#E9E9E9
| 137169 ||  || — || April 9, 1999 || Mount Hopkins || O. A. Naranjo || — || align=right | 3.8 km || 
|-id=170 bgcolor=#FFC2E0
| 137170 ||  || — || April 20, 1999 || Anderson Mesa || LONEOS || ATE +1kmmoon || align=right | 4.4 km || 
|-id=171 bgcolor=#d6d6d6
| 137171 ||  || — || April 19, 1999 || Kitt Peak || Spacewatch || URS || align=right | 7.1 km || 
|-id=172 bgcolor=#d6d6d6
| 137172 ||  || — || April 17, 1999 || Socorro || LINEAR || — || align=right | 4.3 km || 
|-id=173 bgcolor=#FA8072
| 137173 ||  || — || May 10, 1999 || Socorro || LINEAR || — || align=right | 1.3 km || 
|-id=174 bgcolor=#E9E9E9
| 137174 ||  || — || May 10, 1999 || Socorro || LINEAR || BAR || align=right | 1.9 km || 
|-id=175 bgcolor=#FFC2E0
| 137175 ||  || — || May 14, 1999 || Socorro || LINEAR || APO || align=right data-sort-value="0.76" | 760 m || 
|-id=176 bgcolor=#FA8072
| 137176 ||  || — || May 13, 1999 || Socorro || LINEAR || — || align=right | 1.7 km || 
|-id=177 bgcolor=#E9E9E9
| 137177 ||  || — || May 8, 1999 || Catalina || CSS || — || align=right | 3.6 km || 
|-id=178 bgcolor=#fefefe
| 137178 ||  || — || May 10, 1999 || Socorro || LINEAR || — || align=right | 1.3 km || 
|-id=179 bgcolor=#d6d6d6
| 137179 ||  || — || May 15, 1999 || Kitt Peak || Spacewatch || — || align=right | 4.6 km || 
|-id=180 bgcolor=#d6d6d6
| 137180 ||  || — || May 10, 1999 || Socorro || LINEAR || — || align=right | 5.8 km || 
|-id=181 bgcolor=#d6d6d6
| 137181 ||  || — || May 10, 1999 || Socorro || LINEAR || EUP || align=right | 6.0 km || 
|-id=182 bgcolor=#d6d6d6
| 137182 ||  || — || May 10, 1999 || Socorro || LINEAR || — || align=right | 5.0 km || 
|-id=183 bgcolor=#d6d6d6
| 137183 ||  || — || May 10, 1999 || Socorro || LINEAR || — || align=right | 6.8 km || 
|-id=184 bgcolor=#FA8072
| 137184 ||  || — || May 10, 1999 || Socorro || LINEAR || unusual || align=right | 4.8 km || 
|-id=185 bgcolor=#E9E9E9
| 137185 ||  || — || May 12, 1999 || Socorro || LINEAR || — || align=right | 3.2 km || 
|-id=186 bgcolor=#E9E9E9
| 137186 ||  || — || May 12, 1999 || Socorro || LINEAR || — || align=right | 3.8 km || 
|-id=187 bgcolor=#d6d6d6
| 137187 ||  || — || May 12, 1999 || Socorro || LINEAR || LIX || align=right | 6.7 km || 
|-id=188 bgcolor=#E9E9E9
| 137188 ||  || — || May 14, 1999 || Socorro || LINEAR || — || align=right | 6.4 km || 
|-id=189 bgcolor=#E9E9E9
| 137189 ||  || — || May 12, 1999 || Socorro || LINEAR || — || align=right | 3.2 km || 
|-id=190 bgcolor=#E9E9E9
| 137190 ||  || — || May 12, 1999 || Socorro || LINEAR || — || align=right | 5.4 km || 
|-id=191 bgcolor=#d6d6d6
| 137191 ||  || — || May 12, 1999 || Socorro || LINEAR || EOS || align=right | 4.3 km || 
|-id=192 bgcolor=#E9E9E9
| 137192 ||  || — || May 12, 1999 || Socorro || LINEAR || — || align=right | 4.5 km || 
|-id=193 bgcolor=#d6d6d6
| 137193 ||  || — || May 12, 1999 || Socorro || LINEAR || THB || align=right | 6.1 km || 
|-id=194 bgcolor=#fefefe
| 137194 ||  || — || May 13, 1999 || Socorro || LINEAR || FLO || align=right | 1.1 km || 
|-id=195 bgcolor=#E9E9E9
| 137195 ||  || — || May 13, 1999 || Socorro || LINEAR || — || align=right | 2.9 km || 
|-id=196 bgcolor=#E9E9E9
| 137196 ||  || — || May 12, 1999 || Socorro || LINEAR || CLO || align=right | 5.1 km || 
|-id=197 bgcolor=#fefefe
| 137197 ||  || — || May 17, 1999 || Catalina || CSS || — || align=right | 1.0 km || 
|-id=198 bgcolor=#fefefe
| 137198 ||  || — || May 16, 1999 || Kitt Peak || Spacewatch || MAS || align=right | 1.3 km || 
|-id=199 bgcolor=#FFC2E0
| 137199 ||  || — || May 20, 1999 || Socorro || LINEAR || AMO +1km || align=right | 1.5 km || 
|-id=200 bgcolor=#E9E9E9
| 137200 ||  || — || May 18, 1999 || Socorro || LINEAR || — || align=right | 2.7 km || 
|}

137201–137300 

|-bgcolor=#FA8072
| 137201 ||  || — || May 18, 1999 || Socorro || LINEAR || — || align=right data-sort-value="0.97" | 970 m || 
|-id=202 bgcolor=#d6d6d6
| 137202 ||  || — || May 18, 1999 || Socorro || LINEAR || — || align=right | 6.3 km || 
|-id=203 bgcolor=#fefefe
| 137203 || 1999 LX || — || June 7, 1999 || Prescott || P. G. Comba || — || align=right | 1.4 km || 
|-id=204 bgcolor=#d6d6d6
| 137204 ||  || — || June 5, 1999 || Kitt Peak || Spacewatch || — || align=right | 7.4 km || 
|-id=205 bgcolor=#d6d6d6
| 137205 ||  || — || June 8, 1999 || Socorro || LINEAR || MEL || align=right | 4.5 km || 
|-id=206 bgcolor=#FA8072
| 137206 ||  || — || June 9, 1999 || Socorro || LINEAR || — || align=right | 1.3 km || 
|-id=207 bgcolor=#d6d6d6
| 137207 ||  || — || June 14, 1999 || Kitt Peak || Spacewatch || — || align=right | 6.5 km || 
|-id=208 bgcolor=#FA8072
| 137208 ||  || — || June 20, 1999 || Catalina || CSS || — || align=right | 1.6 km || 
|-id=209 bgcolor=#fefefe
| 137209 ||  || — || July 12, 1999 || Socorro || LINEAR || — || align=right | 2.1 km || 
|-id=210 bgcolor=#fefefe
| 137210 ||  || — || July 12, 1999 || Socorro || LINEAR || — || align=right | 1.6 km || 
|-id=211 bgcolor=#fefefe
| 137211 ||  || — || July 13, 1999 || Reedy Creek || J. Broughton || — || align=right | 1.6 km || 
|-id=212 bgcolor=#fefefe
| 137212 ||  || — || July 13, 1999 || Socorro || LINEAR || — || align=right | 1.3 km || 
|-id=213 bgcolor=#fefefe
| 137213 ||  || — || July 13, 1999 || Socorro || LINEAR || — || align=right | 1.5 km || 
|-id=214 bgcolor=#fefefe
| 137214 ||  || — || July 14, 1999 || Socorro || LINEAR || — || align=right | 1.4 km || 
|-id=215 bgcolor=#fefefe
| 137215 ||  || — || July 14, 1999 || Socorro || LINEAR || — || align=right | 1.5 km || 
|-id=216 bgcolor=#fefefe
| 137216 ||  || — || July 13, 1999 || Socorro || LINEAR || — || align=right | 1.6 km || 
|-id=217 bgcolor=#fefefe
| 137217 Racah ||  ||  || July 8, 1999 || Wise || I. Manulis, A. Gal-Yam || V || align=right | 1.2 km || 
|-id=218 bgcolor=#fefefe
| 137218 ||  || — || July 21, 1999 || Anderson Mesa || LONEOS || — || align=right | 1.5 km || 
|-id=219 bgcolor=#fefefe
| 137219 ||  || — || August 8, 1999 || Kitt Peak || Spacewatch || — || align=right | 1.3 km || 
|-id=220 bgcolor=#fefefe
| 137220 ||  || — || August 12, 1999 || Anderson Mesa || LONEOS || — || align=right | 2.4 km || 
|-id=221 bgcolor=#fefefe
| 137221 || 1999 RX || — || September 4, 1999 || Catalina || CSS || FLO || align=right | 1.3 km || 
|-id=222 bgcolor=#fefefe
| 137222 ||  || — || September 4, 1999 || Catalina || CSS || FLO || align=right | 1.5 km || 
|-id=223 bgcolor=#fefefe
| 137223 ||  || — || September 3, 1999 || Kitt Peak || Spacewatch || — || align=right | 1.4 km || 
|-id=224 bgcolor=#fefefe
| 137224 ||  || — || September 7, 1999 || Kitt Peak || Spacewatch || FLO || align=right | 1.3 km || 
|-id=225 bgcolor=#fefefe
| 137225 ||  || — || September 7, 1999 || Socorro || LINEAR || — || align=right | 1.1 km || 
|-id=226 bgcolor=#fefefe
| 137226 ||  || — || September 7, 1999 || Socorro || LINEAR || FLO || align=right data-sort-value="0.90" | 900 m || 
|-id=227 bgcolor=#fefefe
| 137227 ||  || — || September 7, 1999 || Socorro || LINEAR || — || align=right | 1.1 km || 
|-id=228 bgcolor=#fefefe
| 137228 ||  || — || September 7, 1999 || Socorro || LINEAR || — || align=right | 1.5 km || 
|-id=229 bgcolor=#fefefe
| 137229 ||  || — || September 7, 1999 || Socorro || LINEAR || — || align=right | 1.4 km || 
|-id=230 bgcolor=#FA8072
| 137230 ||  || — || September 7, 1999 || Socorro || LINEAR || PHO || align=right | 2.3 km || 
|-id=231 bgcolor=#fefefe
| 137231 ||  || — || September 7, 1999 || Socorro || LINEAR || PHO || align=right | 1.6 km || 
|-id=232 bgcolor=#fefefe
| 137232 ||  || — || September 7, 1999 || Socorro || LINEAR || — || align=right | 1.6 km || 
|-id=233 bgcolor=#fefefe
| 137233 ||  || — || September 7, 1999 || Socorro || LINEAR || — || align=right | 2.0 km || 
|-id=234 bgcolor=#fefefe
| 137234 ||  || — || September 7, 1999 || Socorro || LINEAR || FLO || align=right | 1.9 km || 
|-id=235 bgcolor=#fefefe
| 137235 ||  || — || September 7, 1999 || Socorro || LINEAR || — || align=right | 1.5 km || 
|-id=236 bgcolor=#fefefe
| 137236 ||  || — || September 7, 1999 || Socorro || LINEAR || — || align=right | 1.7 km || 
|-id=237 bgcolor=#fefefe
| 137237 ||  || — || September 7, 1999 || Socorro || LINEAR || — || align=right | 1.3 km || 
|-id=238 bgcolor=#FA8072
| 137238 ||  || — || September 8, 1999 || Socorro || LINEAR || — || align=right | 2.2 km || 
|-id=239 bgcolor=#fefefe
| 137239 ||  || — || September 8, 1999 || Socorro || LINEAR || PHO || align=right | 2.0 km || 
|-id=240 bgcolor=#fefefe
| 137240 ||  || — || September 7, 1999 || Catalina || CSS || PHO || align=right | 2.3 km || 
|-id=241 bgcolor=#fefefe
| 137241 ||  || — || September 11, 1999 || Woomera || F. B. Zoltowski || — || align=right | 1.4 km || 
|-id=242 bgcolor=#fefefe
| 137242 ||  || — || September 7, 1999 || Socorro || LINEAR || FLO || align=right data-sort-value="0.91" | 910 m || 
|-id=243 bgcolor=#fefefe
| 137243 ||  || — || September 7, 1999 || Socorro || LINEAR || V || align=right | 1.1 km || 
|-id=244 bgcolor=#fefefe
| 137244 ||  || — || September 7, 1999 || Socorro || LINEAR || — || align=right | 1.5 km || 
|-id=245 bgcolor=#fefefe
| 137245 ||  || — || September 7, 1999 || Socorro || LINEAR || — || align=right | 1.5 km || 
|-id=246 bgcolor=#fefefe
| 137246 ||  || — || September 7, 1999 || Socorro || LINEAR || fast? || align=right | 1.1 km || 
|-id=247 bgcolor=#fefefe
| 137247 ||  || — || September 7, 1999 || Socorro || LINEAR || — || align=right | 1.3 km || 
|-id=248 bgcolor=#fefefe
| 137248 ||  || — || September 7, 1999 || Socorro || LINEAR || — || align=right | 1.6 km || 
|-id=249 bgcolor=#fefefe
| 137249 ||  || — || September 13, 1999 || Kitt Peak || Spacewatch || — || align=right | 1.4 km || 
|-id=250 bgcolor=#fefefe
| 137250 ||  || — || September 7, 1999 || Socorro || LINEAR || — || align=right | 1.1 km || 
|-id=251 bgcolor=#fefefe
| 137251 ||  || — || September 7, 1999 || Socorro || LINEAR || — || align=right | 1.4 km || 
|-id=252 bgcolor=#fefefe
| 137252 ||  || — || September 7, 1999 || Socorro || LINEAR || FLO || align=right | 1.3 km || 
|-id=253 bgcolor=#fefefe
| 137253 ||  || — || September 7, 1999 || Socorro || LINEAR || — || align=right | 1.7 km || 
|-id=254 bgcolor=#fefefe
| 137254 ||  || — || September 7, 1999 || Socorro || LINEAR || MAS || align=right | 1.4 km || 
|-id=255 bgcolor=#fefefe
| 137255 ||  || — || September 7, 1999 || Socorro || LINEAR || — || align=right | 1.2 km || 
|-id=256 bgcolor=#fefefe
| 137256 ||  || — || September 7, 1999 || Socorro || LINEAR || — || align=right | 1.2 km || 
|-id=257 bgcolor=#fefefe
| 137257 ||  || — || September 7, 1999 || Socorro || LINEAR || FLO || align=right | 1.2 km || 
|-id=258 bgcolor=#fefefe
| 137258 ||  || — || September 7, 1999 || Socorro || LINEAR || — || align=right | 1.4 km || 
|-id=259 bgcolor=#fefefe
| 137259 ||  || — || September 7, 1999 || Socorro || LINEAR || — || align=right | 1.4 km || 
|-id=260 bgcolor=#fefefe
| 137260 ||  || — || September 8, 1999 || Socorro || LINEAR || — || align=right | 1.2 km || 
|-id=261 bgcolor=#fefefe
| 137261 ||  || — || September 8, 1999 || Socorro || LINEAR || FLO || align=right | 1.2 km || 
|-id=262 bgcolor=#fefefe
| 137262 ||  || — || September 9, 1999 || Socorro || LINEAR || FLO || align=right | 1.1 km || 
|-id=263 bgcolor=#fefefe
| 137263 ||  || — || September 9, 1999 || Socorro || LINEAR || — || align=right | 1.5 km || 
|-id=264 bgcolor=#fefefe
| 137264 ||  || — || September 9, 1999 || Socorro || LINEAR || — || align=right | 1.8 km || 
|-id=265 bgcolor=#fefefe
| 137265 ||  || — || September 9, 1999 || Socorro || LINEAR || FLO || align=right | 1.1 km || 
|-id=266 bgcolor=#fefefe
| 137266 ||  || — || September 9, 1999 || Socorro || LINEAR || — || align=right | 1.6 km || 
|-id=267 bgcolor=#fefefe
| 137267 ||  || — || September 9, 1999 || Socorro || LINEAR || V || align=right | 1.3 km || 
|-id=268 bgcolor=#fefefe
| 137268 ||  || — || September 9, 1999 || Socorro || LINEAR || — || align=right | 1.4 km || 
|-id=269 bgcolor=#fefefe
| 137269 ||  || — || September 9, 1999 || Socorro || LINEAR || V || align=right | 1.3 km || 
|-id=270 bgcolor=#fefefe
| 137270 ||  || — || September 9, 1999 || Socorro || LINEAR || — || align=right | 1.9 km || 
|-id=271 bgcolor=#fefefe
| 137271 ||  || — || September 9, 1999 || Socorro || LINEAR || FLO || align=right | 1.1 km || 
|-id=272 bgcolor=#fefefe
| 137272 ||  || — || September 9, 1999 || Socorro || LINEAR || — || align=right | 1.4 km || 
|-id=273 bgcolor=#fefefe
| 137273 ||  || — || September 9, 1999 || Socorro || LINEAR || FLO || align=right | 1.1 km || 
|-id=274 bgcolor=#fefefe
| 137274 ||  || — || September 9, 1999 || Socorro || LINEAR || — || align=right | 1.5 km || 
|-id=275 bgcolor=#fefefe
| 137275 ||  || — || September 9, 1999 || Socorro || LINEAR || V || align=right | 1.3 km || 
|-id=276 bgcolor=#fefefe
| 137276 ||  || — || September 9, 1999 || Socorro || LINEAR || FLO || align=right | 1.2 km || 
|-id=277 bgcolor=#fefefe
| 137277 ||  || — || September 9, 1999 || Socorro || LINEAR || — || align=right | 1.8 km || 
|-id=278 bgcolor=#fefefe
| 137278 ||  || — || September 9, 1999 || Socorro || LINEAR || — || align=right | 1.6 km || 
|-id=279 bgcolor=#fefefe
| 137279 ||  || — || September 9, 1999 || Socorro || LINEAR || V || align=right | 1.1 km || 
|-id=280 bgcolor=#fefefe
| 137280 ||  || — || September 9, 1999 || Socorro || LINEAR || V || align=right | 1.1 km || 
|-id=281 bgcolor=#fefefe
| 137281 ||  || — || September 9, 1999 || Socorro || LINEAR || — || align=right | 1.4 km || 
|-id=282 bgcolor=#fefefe
| 137282 ||  || — || September 9, 1999 || Socorro || LINEAR || V || align=right | 1.1 km || 
|-id=283 bgcolor=#fefefe
| 137283 ||  || — || September 9, 1999 || Socorro || LINEAR || NYS || align=right | 1.0 km || 
|-id=284 bgcolor=#FA8072
| 137284 ||  || — || September 9, 1999 || Socorro || LINEAR || — || align=right | 1.0 km || 
|-id=285 bgcolor=#fefefe
| 137285 ||  || — || September 9, 1999 || Socorro || LINEAR || FLO || align=right data-sort-value="0.97" | 970 m || 
|-id=286 bgcolor=#fefefe
| 137286 ||  || — || September 9, 1999 || Socorro || LINEAR || — || align=right | 1.3 km || 
|-id=287 bgcolor=#fefefe
| 137287 ||  || — || September 9, 1999 || Socorro || LINEAR || — || align=right | 1.3 km || 
|-id=288 bgcolor=#fefefe
| 137288 ||  || — || September 10, 1999 || Socorro || LINEAR || FLO || align=right | 1.4 km || 
|-id=289 bgcolor=#fefefe
| 137289 ||  || — || September 15, 1999 || Kitt Peak || Spacewatch || V || align=right | 1.0 km || 
|-id=290 bgcolor=#fefefe
| 137290 ||  || — || September 8, 1999 || Socorro || LINEAR || FLO || align=right | 1.3 km || 
|-id=291 bgcolor=#fefefe
| 137291 ||  || — || September 8, 1999 || Socorro || LINEAR || — || align=right | 1.6 km || 
|-id=292 bgcolor=#fefefe
| 137292 ||  || — || September 8, 1999 || Socorro || LINEAR || — || align=right | 1.6 km || 
|-id=293 bgcolor=#fefefe
| 137293 ||  || — || September 8, 1999 || Socorro || LINEAR || V || align=right | 1.4 km || 
|-id=294 bgcolor=#C2E0FF
| 137294 ||  || — || September 7, 1999 || Mauna Kea || C. Trujillo, J. X. Luu, D. C. Jewitt || cubewano (cold)critical || align=right | 223 km || 
|-id=295 bgcolor=#C2E0FF
| 137295 ||  || — || September 8, 1999 || Mauna Kea || C. Trujillo, D. C. Jewitt, J. X. Luu || twotino || align=right | 151 km || 
|-id=296 bgcolor=#fefefe
| 137296 ||  || — || September 6, 1999 || Anderson Mesa || LONEOS || FLO || align=right | 1.2 km || 
|-id=297 bgcolor=#fefefe
| 137297 ||  || — || September 4, 1999 || Catalina || CSS || V || align=right data-sort-value="0.99" | 990 m || 
|-id=298 bgcolor=#fefefe
| 137298 ||  || — || September 4, 1999 || Catalina || CSS || V || align=right | 1.1 km || 
|-id=299 bgcolor=#fefefe
| 137299 ||  || — || September 7, 1999 || Anderson Mesa || LONEOS || FLO || align=right | 1.2 km || 
|-id=300 bgcolor=#fefefe
| 137300 ||  || — || September 8, 1999 || Anderson Mesa || LONEOS || FLO || align=right | 1.5 km || 
|}

137301–137400 

|-bgcolor=#fefefe
| 137301 ||  || — || September 8, 1999 || Socorro || LINEAR || — || align=right | 1.6 km || 
|-id=302 bgcolor=#fefefe
| 137302 ||  || — || September 4, 1999 || Catalina || CSS || FLO || align=right data-sort-value="0.91" | 910 m || 
|-id=303 bgcolor=#fefefe
| 137303 ||  || — || September 23, 1999 || Monte Agliale || M. M. M. Santangelo || FLO || align=right | 1.1 km || 
|-id=304 bgcolor=#FA8072
| 137304 ||  || — || September 27, 1999 || Anderson Mesa || LONEOS || — || align=right | 1.4 km || 
|-id=305 bgcolor=#fefefe
| 137305 ||  || — || September 30, 1999 || Catalina || CSS || MAS || align=right | 1.1 km || 
|-id=306 bgcolor=#fefefe
| 137306 ||  || — || September 29, 1999 || Catalina || CSS || — || align=right | 1.6 km || 
|-id=307 bgcolor=#fefefe
| 137307 ||  || — || September 27, 1999 || Socorro || LINEAR || — || align=right | 2.7 km || 
|-id=308 bgcolor=#fefefe
| 137308 ||  || — || October 2, 1999 || Fountain Hills || C. W. Juels || — || align=right | 1.6 km || 
|-id=309 bgcolor=#fefefe
| 137309 ||  || — || October 1, 1999 || Višnjan Observatory || K. Korlević, M. Jurić || ERI || align=right | 3.4 km || 
|-id=310 bgcolor=#fefefe
| 137310 ||  || — || October 7, 1999 || Višnjan Observatory || K. Korlević, M. Jurić || FLO || align=right | 1.3 km || 
|-id=311 bgcolor=#fefefe
| 137311 ||  || — || October 9, 1999 || Catalina || CSS || — || align=right | 3.9 km || 
|-id=312 bgcolor=#d6d6d6
| 137312 ||  || — || October 10, 1999 || Prescott || P. G. Comba || HIL3:2 || align=right | 8.2 km || 
|-id=313 bgcolor=#fefefe
| 137313 ||  || — || October 12, 1999 || Prescott || P. G. Comba || MAS || align=right data-sort-value="0.92" | 920 m || 
|-id=314 bgcolor=#fefefe
| 137314 ||  || — || October 12, 1999 || Ondřejov || P. Kušnirák || — || align=right data-sort-value="0.96" | 960 m || 
|-id=315 bgcolor=#fefefe
| 137315 ||  || — || October 15, 1999 || Xinglong || SCAP || FLO || align=right data-sort-value="0.98" | 980 m || 
|-id=316 bgcolor=#fefefe
| 137316 ||  || — || October 5, 1999 || Goodricke-Pigott || R. A. Tucker || NYS || align=right | 1.1 km || 
|-id=317 bgcolor=#fefefe
| 137317 ||  || — || October 3, 1999 || Kitt Peak || Spacewatch || — || align=right | 1.4 km || 
|-id=318 bgcolor=#fefefe
| 137318 ||  || — || October 3, 1999 || Kitt Peak || Spacewatch || FLO || align=right | 1.1 km || 
|-id=319 bgcolor=#E9E9E9
| 137319 ||  || — || October 4, 1999 || Kitt Peak || Spacewatch || — || align=right | 1.8 km || 
|-id=320 bgcolor=#fefefe
| 137320 ||  || — || October 4, 1999 || Socorro || LINEAR || FLO || align=right | 1.4 km || 
|-id=321 bgcolor=#fefefe
| 137321 ||  || — || October 4, 1999 || Socorro || LINEAR || — || align=right | 1.4 km || 
|-id=322 bgcolor=#fefefe
| 137322 ||  || — || October 4, 1999 || Socorro || LINEAR || — || align=right | 1.3 km || 
|-id=323 bgcolor=#fefefe
| 137323 ||  || — || October 4, 1999 || Socorro || LINEAR || — || align=right | 1.9 km || 
|-id=324 bgcolor=#fefefe
| 137324 ||  || — || October 6, 1999 || Socorro || LINEAR || — || align=right | 1.5 km || 
|-id=325 bgcolor=#fefefe
| 137325 ||  || — || October 1, 1999 || Catalina || CSS || V || align=right | 1.4 km || 
|-id=326 bgcolor=#fefefe
| 137326 ||  || — || October 5, 1999 || Catalina || CSS || — || align=right | 1.7 km || 
|-id=327 bgcolor=#fefefe
| 137327 ||  || — || October 2, 1999 || Kitt Peak || Spacewatch || — || align=right | 1.3 km || 
|-id=328 bgcolor=#fefefe
| 137328 ||  || — || October 3, 1999 || Kitt Peak || Spacewatch || NYS || align=right data-sort-value="0.85" | 850 m || 
|-id=329 bgcolor=#fefefe
| 137329 ||  || — || October 3, 1999 || Kitt Peak || Spacewatch || — || align=right | 1.2 km || 
|-id=330 bgcolor=#fefefe
| 137330 ||  || — || October 3, 1999 || Kitt Peak || Spacewatch || FLO || align=right | 1.3 km || 
|-id=331 bgcolor=#fefefe
| 137331 ||  || — || October 6, 1999 || Kitt Peak || Spacewatch || V || align=right data-sort-value="0.81" | 810 m || 
|-id=332 bgcolor=#fefefe
| 137332 ||  || — || October 6, 1999 || Kitt Peak || Spacewatch || NYS || align=right data-sort-value="0.91" | 910 m || 
|-id=333 bgcolor=#fefefe
| 137333 ||  || — || October 7, 1999 || Kitt Peak || Spacewatch || V || align=right | 1.3 km || 
|-id=334 bgcolor=#fefefe
| 137334 ||  || — || October 8, 1999 || Kitt Peak || Spacewatch || — || align=right | 1.1 km || 
|-id=335 bgcolor=#fefefe
| 137335 ||  || — || October 8, 1999 || Kitt Peak || Spacewatch || NYS || align=right data-sort-value="0.92" | 920 m || 
|-id=336 bgcolor=#fefefe
| 137336 ||  || — || October 8, 1999 || Kitt Peak || Spacewatch || NYS || align=right | 1.1 km || 
|-id=337 bgcolor=#fefefe
| 137337 ||  || — || October 10, 1999 || Kitt Peak || Spacewatch || — || align=right data-sort-value="0.97" | 970 m || 
|-id=338 bgcolor=#fefefe
| 137338 ||  || — || October 10, 1999 || Kitt Peak || Spacewatch || — || align=right | 1.5 km || 
|-id=339 bgcolor=#fefefe
| 137339 ||  || — || October 11, 1999 || Kitt Peak || Spacewatch || — || align=right | 1.1 km || 
|-id=340 bgcolor=#fefefe
| 137340 ||  || — || October 12, 1999 || Kitt Peak || Spacewatch || — || align=right | 1.2 km || 
|-id=341 bgcolor=#d6d6d6
| 137341 ||  || — || October 12, 1999 || Kitt Peak || Spacewatch || THM || align=right | 3.5 km || 
|-id=342 bgcolor=#fefefe
| 137342 ||  || — || October 14, 1999 || Kitt Peak || Spacewatch || MAS || align=right data-sort-value="0.82" | 820 m || 
|-id=343 bgcolor=#fefefe
| 137343 ||  || — || October 14, 1999 || Kitt Peak || Spacewatch || — || align=right data-sort-value="0.89" | 890 m || 
|-id=344 bgcolor=#fefefe
| 137344 ||  || — || October 2, 1999 || Socorro || LINEAR || NYS || align=right | 1.1 km || 
|-id=345 bgcolor=#fefefe
| 137345 ||  || — || October 2, 1999 || Socorro || LINEAR || — || align=right | 1.3 km || 
|-id=346 bgcolor=#fefefe
| 137346 ||  || — || October 2, 1999 || Socorro || LINEAR || FLO || align=right | 1.3 km || 
|-id=347 bgcolor=#fefefe
| 137347 ||  || — || October 2, 1999 || Socorro || LINEAR || FLO || align=right | 1.2 km || 
|-id=348 bgcolor=#fefefe
| 137348 ||  || — || October 2, 1999 || Socorro || LINEAR || — || align=right | 1.6 km || 
|-id=349 bgcolor=#d6d6d6
| 137349 ||  || — || October 2, 1999 || Socorro || LINEAR || HIL3:2 || align=right | 11 km || 
|-id=350 bgcolor=#fefefe
| 137350 ||  || — || October 2, 1999 || Socorro || LINEAR || — || align=right | 1.7 km || 
|-id=351 bgcolor=#fefefe
| 137351 ||  || — || October 2, 1999 || Socorro || LINEAR || FLO || align=right | 1.2 km || 
|-id=352 bgcolor=#fefefe
| 137352 ||  || — || October 3, 1999 || Socorro || LINEAR || — || align=right | 1.6 km || 
|-id=353 bgcolor=#fefefe
| 137353 ||  || — || October 3, 1999 || Socorro || LINEAR || — || align=right | 1.5 km || 
|-id=354 bgcolor=#fefefe
| 137354 ||  || — || October 3, 1999 || Socorro || LINEAR || — || align=right | 1.2 km || 
|-id=355 bgcolor=#fefefe
| 137355 ||  || — || October 4, 1999 || Socorro || LINEAR || — || align=right | 1.7 km || 
|-id=356 bgcolor=#fefefe
| 137356 ||  || — || October 4, 1999 || Socorro || LINEAR || — || align=right | 1.6 km || 
|-id=357 bgcolor=#fefefe
| 137357 ||  || — || October 4, 1999 || Socorro || LINEAR || FLO || align=right | 1.2 km || 
|-id=358 bgcolor=#fefefe
| 137358 ||  || — || October 4, 1999 || Socorro || LINEAR || V || align=right | 1.1 km || 
|-id=359 bgcolor=#fefefe
| 137359 ||  || — || October 4, 1999 || Socorro || LINEAR || — || align=right | 1.9 km || 
|-id=360 bgcolor=#fefefe
| 137360 ||  || — || October 4, 1999 || Socorro || LINEAR || FLO || align=right | 1.5 km || 
|-id=361 bgcolor=#fefefe
| 137361 ||  || — || October 4, 1999 || Socorro || LINEAR || — || align=right | 1.4 km || 
|-id=362 bgcolor=#fefefe
| 137362 ||  || — || October 4, 1999 || Socorro || LINEAR || FLO || align=right | 1.0 km || 
|-id=363 bgcolor=#fefefe
| 137363 ||  || — || October 4, 1999 || Socorro || LINEAR || — || align=right | 1.4 km || 
|-id=364 bgcolor=#fefefe
| 137364 ||  || — || October 4, 1999 || Socorro || LINEAR || NYS || align=right | 1.1 km || 
|-id=365 bgcolor=#fefefe
| 137365 ||  || — || October 4, 1999 || Socorro || LINEAR || NYS || align=right data-sort-value="0.91" | 910 m || 
|-id=366 bgcolor=#fefefe
| 137366 ||  || — || October 4, 1999 || Socorro || LINEAR || V || align=right | 1.2 km || 
|-id=367 bgcolor=#fefefe
| 137367 ||  || — || October 4, 1999 || Socorro || LINEAR || FLO || align=right | 1.0 km || 
|-id=368 bgcolor=#fefefe
| 137368 ||  || — || October 4, 1999 || Socorro || LINEAR || NYS || align=right | 1.1 km || 
|-id=369 bgcolor=#fefefe
| 137369 ||  || — || October 4, 1999 || Socorro || LINEAR || — || align=right | 1.2 km || 
|-id=370 bgcolor=#fefefe
| 137370 ||  || — || October 4, 1999 || Socorro || LINEAR || FLO || align=right data-sort-value="0.92" | 920 m || 
|-id=371 bgcolor=#fefefe
| 137371 ||  || — || October 4, 1999 || Socorro || LINEAR || NYS || align=right | 1.5 km || 
|-id=372 bgcolor=#fefefe
| 137372 ||  || — || October 4, 1999 || Socorro || LINEAR || V || align=right | 1.1 km || 
|-id=373 bgcolor=#fefefe
| 137373 ||  || — || October 4, 1999 || Socorro || LINEAR || — || align=right | 1.3 km || 
|-id=374 bgcolor=#fefefe
| 137374 ||  || — || October 4, 1999 || Socorro || LINEAR || NYS || align=right data-sort-value="0.97" | 970 m || 
|-id=375 bgcolor=#fefefe
| 137375 ||  || — || October 6, 1999 || Socorro || LINEAR || — || align=right | 1.5 km || 
|-id=376 bgcolor=#fefefe
| 137376 ||  || — || October 6, 1999 || Socorro || LINEAR || — || align=right | 1.6 km || 
|-id=377 bgcolor=#fefefe
| 137377 ||  || — || October 6, 1999 || Socorro || LINEAR || — || align=right | 1.1 km || 
|-id=378 bgcolor=#fefefe
| 137378 ||  || — || October 6, 1999 || Socorro || LINEAR || V || align=right | 1.1 km || 
|-id=379 bgcolor=#fefefe
| 137379 ||  || — || October 6, 1999 || Socorro || LINEAR || MAS || align=right | 1.3 km || 
|-id=380 bgcolor=#fefefe
| 137380 ||  || — || October 7, 1999 || Socorro || LINEAR || — || align=right | 1.5 km || 
|-id=381 bgcolor=#fefefe
| 137381 ||  || — || October 7, 1999 || Socorro || LINEAR || NYS || align=right | 1.2 km || 
|-id=382 bgcolor=#fefefe
| 137382 ||  || — || October 7, 1999 || Socorro || LINEAR || — || align=right | 1.6 km || 
|-id=383 bgcolor=#fefefe
| 137383 ||  || — || October 7, 1999 || Socorro || LINEAR || — || align=right | 1.2 km || 
|-id=384 bgcolor=#fefefe
| 137384 ||  || — || October 7, 1999 || Socorro || LINEAR || ERI || align=right | 3.2 km || 
|-id=385 bgcolor=#fefefe
| 137385 ||  || — || October 7, 1999 || Socorro || LINEAR || — || align=right | 1.1 km || 
|-id=386 bgcolor=#fefefe
| 137386 ||  || — || October 7, 1999 || Socorro || LINEAR || — || align=right | 1.3 km || 
|-id=387 bgcolor=#fefefe
| 137387 ||  || — || October 7, 1999 || Socorro || LINEAR || MAS || align=right | 1.8 km || 
|-id=388 bgcolor=#fefefe
| 137388 ||  || — || October 9, 1999 || Socorro || LINEAR || — || align=right | 1.3 km || 
|-id=389 bgcolor=#fefefe
| 137389 ||  || — || October 9, 1999 || Socorro || LINEAR || — || align=right | 1.3 km || 
|-id=390 bgcolor=#fefefe
| 137390 ||  || — || October 9, 1999 || Socorro || LINEAR || — || align=right | 1.4 km || 
|-id=391 bgcolor=#fefefe
| 137391 ||  || — || October 7, 1999 || Socorro || LINEAR || ERI || align=right | 1.6 km || 
|-id=392 bgcolor=#fefefe
| 137392 ||  || — || October 9, 1999 || Socorro || LINEAR || V || align=right | 1.0 km || 
|-id=393 bgcolor=#fefefe
| 137393 ||  || — || October 9, 1999 || Socorro || LINEAR || NYS || align=right | 1.2 km || 
|-id=394 bgcolor=#fefefe
| 137394 ||  || — || October 9, 1999 || Socorro || LINEAR || NYS || align=right | 1.1 km || 
|-id=395 bgcolor=#fefefe
| 137395 ||  || — || October 9, 1999 || Socorro || LINEAR || — || align=right | 1.5 km || 
|-id=396 bgcolor=#fefefe
| 137396 ||  || — || October 10, 1999 || Socorro || LINEAR || PHO || align=right | 1.9 km || 
|-id=397 bgcolor=#fefefe
| 137397 ||  || — || October 10, 1999 || Socorro || LINEAR || ERI || align=right | 2.8 km || 
|-id=398 bgcolor=#fefefe
| 137398 ||  || — || October 10, 1999 || Socorro || LINEAR || — || align=right | 1.5 km || 
|-id=399 bgcolor=#fefefe
| 137399 ||  || — || October 10, 1999 || Socorro || LINEAR || — || align=right | 1.2 km || 
|-id=400 bgcolor=#fefefe
| 137400 ||  || — || October 10, 1999 || Socorro || LINEAR || — || align=right | 1.2 km || 
|}

137401–137500 

|-bgcolor=#fefefe
| 137401 ||  || — || October 10, 1999 || Socorro || LINEAR || — || align=right | 1.7 km || 
|-id=402 bgcolor=#fefefe
| 137402 ||  || — || October 10, 1999 || Socorro || LINEAR || — || align=right | 1.2 km || 
|-id=403 bgcolor=#fefefe
| 137403 ||  || — || October 10, 1999 || Socorro || LINEAR || — || align=right | 1.3 km || 
|-id=404 bgcolor=#fefefe
| 137404 ||  || — || October 10, 1999 || Socorro || LINEAR || — || align=right | 2.2 km || 
|-id=405 bgcolor=#fefefe
| 137405 ||  || — || October 10, 1999 || Socorro || LINEAR || — || align=right | 1.6 km || 
|-id=406 bgcolor=#fefefe
| 137406 ||  || — || October 10, 1999 || Socorro || LINEAR || — || align=right | 1.5 km || 
|-id=407 bgcolor=#fefefe
| 137407 ||  || — || October 10, 1999 || Socorro || LINEAR || V || align=right | 1.1 km || 
|-id=408 bgcolor=#fefefe
| 137408 ||  || — || October 11, 1999 || Socorro || LINEAR || — || align=right | 1.3 km || 
|-id=409 bgcolor=#fefefe
| 137409 ||  || — || October 12, 1999 || Socorro || LINEAR || — || align=right | 1.8 km || 
|-id=410 bgcolor=#fefefe
| 137410 ||  || — || October 12, 1999 || Socorro || LINEAR || V || align=right data-sort-value="0.96" | 960 m || 
|-id=411 bgcolor=#fefefe
| 137411 ||  || — || October 12, 1999 || Socorro || LINEAR || — || align=right | 1.4 km || 
|-id=412 bgcolor=#fefefe
| 137412 ||  || — || October 12, 1999 || Socorro || LINEAR || — || align=right | 1.6 km || 
|-id=413 bgcolor=#fefefe
| 137413 ||  || — || October 12, 1999 || Socorro || LINEAR || — || align=right | 1.4 km || 
|-id=414 bgcolor=#fefefe
| 137414 ||  || — || October 12, 1999 || Socorro || LINEAR || — || align=right | 1.6 km || 
|-id=415 bgcolor=#fefefe
| 137415 ||  || — || October 12, 1999 || Socorro || LINEAR || — || align=right | 1.7 km || 
|-id=416 bgcolor=#fefefe
| 137416 ||  || — || October 12, 1999 || Socorro || LINEAR || — || align=right | 1.5 km || 
|-id=417 bgcolor=#fefefe
| 137417 ||  || — || October 12, 1999 || Socorro || LINEAR || — || align=right | 1.5 km || 
|-id=418 bgcolor=#fefefe
| 137418 ||  || — || October 12, 1999 || Socorro || LINEAR || — || align=right | 1.4 km || 
|-id=419 bgcolor=#fefefe
| 137419 ||  || — || October 12, 1999 || Socorro || LINEAR || — || align=right | 1.6 km || 
|-id=420 bgcolor=#fefefe
| 137420 ||  || — || October 12, 1999 || Socorro || LINEAR || V || align=right | 1.2 km || 
|-id=421 bgcolor=#fefefe
| 137421 ||  || — || October 12, 1999 || Socorro || LINEAR || V || align=right | 1.5 km || 
|-id=422 bgcolor=#fefefe
| 137422 ||  || — || October 13, 1999 || Socorro || LINEAR || — || align=right | 1.3 km || 
|-id=423 bgcolor=#E9E9E9
| 137423 ||  || — || October 13, 1999 || Socorro || LINEAR || — || align=right | 3.0 km || 
|-id=424 bgcolor=#fefefe
| 137424 ||  || — || October 13, 1999 || Socorro || LINEAR || — || align=right | 1.5 km || 
|-id=425 bgcolor=#fefefe
| 137425 ||  || — || October 13, 1999 || Socorro || LINEAR || — || align=right | 1.2 km || 
|-id=426 bgcolor=#fefefe
| 137426 ||  || — || October 14, 1999 || Socorro || LINEAR || — || align=right | 4.0 km || 
|-id=427 bgcolor=#FFC2E0
| 137427 ||  || — || October 15, 1999 || Socorro || LINEAR || APO +1kmPHA || align=right | 3.3 km || 
|-id=428 bgcolor=#fefefe
| 137428 ||  || — || October 15, 1999 || Socorro || LINEAR || — || align=right | 1.2 km || 
|-id=429 bgcolor=#fefefe
| 137429 ||  || — || October 15, 1999 || Socorro || LINEAR || — || align=right | 1.5 km || 
|-id=430 bgcolor=#fefefe
| 137430 ||  || — || October 15, 1999 || Socorro || LINEAR || — || align=right | 1.9 km || 
|-id=431 bgcolor=#fefefe
| 137431 ||  || — || October 15, 1999 || Socorro || LINEAR || — || align=right | 1.2 km || 
|-id=432 bgcolor=#fefefe
| 137432 ||  || — || October 15, 1999 || Socorro || LINEAR || — || align=right | 1.3 km || 
|-id=433 bgcolor=#fefefe
| 137433 ||  || — || October 15, 1999 || Socorro || LINEAR || — || align=right | 1.2 km || 
|-id=434 bgcolor=#fefefe
| 137434 ||  || — || October 1, 1999 || Catalina || CSS || — || align=right | 1.5 km || 
|-id=435 bgcolor=#fefefe
| 137435 ||  || — || October 1, 1999 || Catalina || CSS || V || align=right | 1.3 km || 
|-id=436 bgcolor=#fefefe
| 137436 ||  || — || October 2, 1999 || Kitt Peak || Spacewatch || MAS || align=right | 1.5 km || 
|-id=437 bgcolor=#fefefe
| 137437 ||  || — || October 4, 1999 || Socorro || LINEAR || — || align=right | 1.1 km || 
|-id=438 bgcolor=#fefefe
| 137438 ||  || — || October 5, 1999 || Catalina || CSS || V || align=right data-sort-value="0.96" | 960 m || 
|-id=439 bgcolor=#fefefe
| 137439 ||  || — || October 3, 1999 || Socorro || LINEAR || — || align=right | 1.3 km || 
|-id=440 bgcolor=#fefefe
| 137440 ||  || — || October 3, 1999 || Catalina || CSS || V || align=right | 1.2 km || 
|-id=441 bgcolor=#fefefe
| 137441 ||  || — || October 4, 1999 || Catalina || CSS || — || align=right | 1.4 km || 
|-id=442 bgcolor=#fefefe
| 137442 ||  || — || October 4, 1999 || Catalina || CSS || — || align=right | 2.8 km || 
|-id=443 bgcolor=#fefefe
| 137443 ||  || — || October 4, 1999 || Catalina || CSS || NYS || align=right | 2.9 km || 
|-id=444 bgcolor=#FA8072
| 137444 ||  || — || October 12, 1999 || Socorro || LINEAR || PHO || align=right | 3.4 km || 
|-id=445 bgcolor=#fefefe
| 137445 ||  || — || October 6, 1999 || Socorro || LINEAR || V || align=right | 1.3 km || 
|-id=446 bgcolor=#fefefe
| 137446 ||  || — || October 9, 1999 || Socorro || LINEAR || — || align=right | 1.3 km || 
|-id=447 bgcolor=#fefefe
| 137447 ||  || — || October 8, 1999 || Socorro || LINEAR || — || align=right | 1.8 km || 
|-id=448 bgcolor=#fefefe
| 137448 ||  || — || October 9, 1999 || Socorro || LINEAR || — || align=right | 1.3 km || 
|-id=449 bgcolor=#fefefe
| 137449 ||  || — || October 15, 1999 || Kitt Peak || Spacewatch || FLO || align=right data-sort-value="0.94" | 940 m || 
|-id=450 bgcolor=#fefefe
| 137450 ||  || — || October 5, 1999 || Socorro || LINEAR || — || align=right | 2.7 km || 
|-id=451 bgcolor=#fefefe
| 137451 ||  || — || October 7, 1999 || Socorro || LINEAR || — || align=right | 1.3 km || 
|-id=452 bgcolor=#E9E9E9
| 137452 ||  || — || October 8, 1999 || Socorro || LINEAR || — || align=right | 2.5 km || 
|-id=453 bgcolor=#fefefe
| 137453 ||  || — || October 9, 1999 || Socorro || LINEAR || V || align=right data-sort-value="0.99" | 990 m || 
|-id=454 bgcolor=#fefefe
| 137454 ||  || — || October 9, 1999 || Socorro || LINEAR || — || align=right | 1.4 km || 
|-id=455 bgcolor=#fefefe
| 137455 ||  || — || October 9, 1999 || Socorro || LINEAR || — || align=right | 1.7 km || 
|-id=456 bgcolor=#fefefe
| 137456 ||  || — || October 10, 1999 || Socorro || LINEAR || — || align=right | 1.3 km || 
|-id=457 bgcolor=#fefefe
| 137457 ||  || — || October 10, 1999 || Socorro || LINEAR || — || align=right | 1.6 km || 
|-id=458 bgcolor=#fefefe
| 137458 ||  || — || October 10, 1999 || Socorro || LINEAR || FLO || align=right | 1.4 km || 
|-id=459 bgcolor=#fefefe
| 137459 ||  || — || October 12, 1999 || Socorro || LINEAR || FLO || align=right | 1.3 km || 
|-id=460 bgcolor=#d6d6d6
| 137460 ||  || — || October 6, 1999 || Socorro || LINEAR || — || align=right | 3.9 km || 
|-id=461 bgcolor=#fefefe
| 137461 ||  || — || October 10, 1999 || Kitt Peak || Spacewatch || — || align=right | 1.5 km || 
|-id=462 bgcolor=#fefefe
| 137462 ||  || — || October 10, 1999 || Kitt Peak || Spacewatch || NYS || align=right data-sort-value="0.85" | 850 m || 
|-id=463 bgcolor=#fefefe
| 137463 ||  || — || October 10, 1999 || Socorro || LINEAR || — || align=right | 1.2 km || 
|-id=464 bgcolor=#fefefe
| 137464 ||  || — || October 10, 1999 || Socorro || LINEAR || — || align=right | 1.4 km || 
|-id=465 bgcolor=#fefefe
| 137465 ||  || — || October 19, 1999 || Bergisch Gladbach || W. Bickel || — || align=right | 1.3 km || 
|-id=466 bgcolor=#fefefe
| 137466 ||  || — || October 27, 1999 || Starkenburg Observatory || Starkenburg Obs. || NYS || align=right | 1.2 km || 
|-id=467 bgcolor=#fefefe
| 137467 ||  || — || October 29, 1999 || Catalina || CSS || — || align=right | 1.6 km || 
|-id=468 bgcolor=#fefefe
| 137468 ||  || — || October 29, 1999 || Kitt Peak || Spacewatch || NYS || align=right | 1.3 km || 
|-id=469 bgcolor=#fefefe
| 137469 ||  || — || October 29, 1999 || Catalina || CSS || — || align=right | 1.7 km || 
|-id=470 bgcolor=#fefefe
| 137470 ||  || — || October 29, 1999 || Catalina || CSS || — || align=right | 1.5 km || 
|-id=471 bgcolor=#fefefe
| 137471 ||  || — || October 29, 1999 || Catalina || CSS || — || align=right | 1.6 km || 
|-id=472 bgcolor=#fefefe
| 137472 ||  || — || October 29, 1999 || Catalina || CSS || NYS || align=right | 1.1 km || 
|-id=473 bgcolor=#fefefe
| 137473 ||  || — || October 30, 1999 || Catalina || CSS || ERI || align=right | 2.7 km || 
|-id=474 bgcolor=#fefefe
| 137474 ||  || — || October 30, 1999 || Kitt Peak || Spacewatch || NYS || align=right | 1.1 km || 
|-id=475 bgcolor=#fefefe
| 137475 ||  || — || October 30, 1999 || Kitt Peak || Spacewatch || FLO || align=right data-sort-value="0.95" | 950 m || 
|-id=476 bgcolor=#fefefe
| 137476 ||  || — || October 31, 1999 || Kitt Peak || Spacewatch || — || align=right data-sort-value="0.99" | 990 m || 
|-id=477 bgcolor=#fefefe
| 137477 ||  || — || October 31, 1999 || Kitt Peak || Spacewatch || — || align=right | 1.4 km || 
|-id=478 bgcolor=#fefefe
| 137478 ||  || — || October 31, 1999 || Kitt Peak || Spacewatch || — || align=right | 1.2 km || 
|-id=479 bgcolor=#fefefe
| 137479 ||  || — || October 28, 1999 || Catalina || CSS || — || align=right | 1.5 km || 
|-id=480 bgcolor=#fefefe
| 137480 ||  || — || October 31, 1999 || Kitt Peak || Spacewatch || — || align=right | 1.4 km || 
|-id=481 bgcolor=#fefefe
| 137481 ||  || — || October 31, 1999 || Kitt Peak || Spacewatch || — || align=right | 1.2 km || 
|-id=482 bgcolor=#fefefe
| 137482 ||  || — || October 31, 1999 || Kitt Peak || Spacewatch || — || align=right | 1.2 km || 
|-id=483 bgcolor=#fefefe
| 137483 ||  || — || October 31, 1999 || Kitt Peak || Spacewatch || NYS || align=right data-sort-value="0.86" | 860 m || 
|-id=484 bgcolor=#fefefe
| 137484 ||  || — || October 31, 1999 || Kitt Peak || Spacewatch || NYS || align=right data-sort-value="0.94" | 940 m || 
|-id=485 bgcolor=#fefefe
| 137485 ||  || — || October 30, 1999 || Kitt Peak || Spacewatch || — || align=right | 1.2 km || 
|-id=486 bgcolor=#fefefe
| 137486 ||  || — || October 31, 1999 || Kitt Peak || Spacewatch || — || align=right | 1.4 km || 
|-id=487 bgcolor=#fefefe
| 137487 ||  || — || October 16, 1999 || Kitt Peak || Spacewatch || — || align=right | 1.3 km || 
|-id=488 bgcolor=#fefefe
| 137488 ||  || — || October 29, 1999 || Catalina || CSS || — || align=right | 1.4 km || 
|-id=489 bgcolor=#fefefe
| 137489 ||  || — || October 31, 1999 || Catalina || CSS || — || align=right | 1.3 km || 
|-id=490 bgcolor=#fefefe
| 137490 ||  || — || October 30, 1999 || Catalina || CSS || NYS || align=right | 1.4 km || 
|-id=491 bgcolor=#fefefe
| 137491 ||  || — || October 31, 1999 || Catalina || CSS || — || align=right | 1.6 km || 
|-id=492 bgcolor=#fefefe
| 137492 ||  || — || October 31, 1999 || Catalina || CSS || FLO || align=right | 1.2 km || 
|-id=493 bgcolor=#fefefe
| 137493 ||  || — || October 31, 1999 || Catalina || CSS || FLO || align=right | 1.5 km || 
|-id=494 bgcolor=#fefefe
| 137494 ||  || — || October 31, 1999 || Catalina || CSS || — || align=right | 2.2 km || 
|-id=495 bgcolor=#fefefe
| 137495 ||  || — || October 21, 1999 || Socorro || LINEAR || FLO || align=right | 1.1 km || 
|-id=496 bgcolor=#fefefe
| 137496 ||  || — || October 19, 1999 || Kitt Peak || Spacewatch || — || align=right | 1.4 km || 
|-id=497 bgcolor=#fefefe
| 137497 || 1999 VH || — || November 1, 1999 || Ondřejov || L. Kotková || NYS || align=right data-sort-value="0.96" | 960 m || 
|-id=498 bgcolor=#fefefe
| 137498 ||  || — || November 7, 1999 || Gnosca || S. Sposetti || ERI || align=right | 3.9 km || 
|-id=499 bgcolor=#fefefe
| 137499 ||  || — || November 5, 1999 || Farpoint || Farpoint Obs. || ERI || align=right | 2.9 km || 
|-id=500 bgcolor=#fefefe
| 137500 ||  || — || November 1, 1999 || Socorro || LINEAR || PHO || align=right | 2.0 km || 
|}

137501–137600 

|-bgcolor=#fefefe
| 137501 ||  || — || November 2, 1999 || Kitt Peak || Spacewatch || — || align=right | 1.1 km || 
|-id=502 bgcolor=#fefefe
| 137502 ||  || — || November 10, 1999 || Višnjan Observatory || K. Korlević || FLO || align=right | 1.2 km || 
|-id=503 bgcolor=#fefefe
| 137503 ||  || — || November 10, 1999 || Višnjan Observatory || K. Korlević || FLO || align=right | 1.3 km || 
|-id=504 bgcolor=#FA8072
| 137504 ||  || — || November 12, 1999 || Višnjan Observatory || K. Korlević || — || align=right | 1.3 km || 
|-id=505 bgcolor=#fefefe
| 137505 ||  || — || November 12, 1999 || Višnjan Observatory || K. Korlević || NYS || align=right | 1.2 km || 
|-id=506 bgcolor=#fefefe
| 137506 ||  || — || November 12, 1999 || Višnjan Observatory || K. Korlević || — || align=right | 1.3 km || 
|-id=507 bgcolor=#fefefe
| 137507 ||  || — || November 8, 1999 || Majorca || R. Pacheco, Á. López J. || V || align=right data-sort-value="0.98" | 980 m || 
|-id=508 bgcolor=#fefefe
| 137508 ||  || — || November 3, 1999 || Catalina || CSS || ERI || align=right | 2.5 km || 
|-id=509 bgcolor=#fefefe
| 137509 ||  || — || November 3, 1999 || Socorro || LINEAR || — || align=right | 1.7 km || 
|-id=510 bgcolor=#fefefe
| 137510 ||  || — || November 3, 1999 || Socorro || LINEAR || V || align=right | 1.3 km || 
|-id=511 bgcolor=#fefefe
| 137511 ||  || — || November 3, 1999 || Socorro || LINEAR || — || align=right | 1.4 km || 
|-id=512 bgcolor=#fefefe
| 137512 ||  || — || November 3, 1999 || Socorro || LINEAR || V || align=right | 1.3 km || 
|-id=513 bgcolor=#fefefe
| 137513 ||  || — || November 3, 1999 || Socorro || LINEAR || — || align=right | 1.6 km || 
|-id=514 bgcolor=#fefefe
| 137514 ||  || — || November 3, 1999 || Socorro || LINEAR || — || align=right | 1.7 km || 
|-id=515 bgcolor=#fefefe
| 137515 ||  || — || November 3, 1999 || Socorro || LINEAR || NYS || align=right | 1.3 km || 
|-id=516 bgcolor=#fefefe
| 137516 ||  || — || November 4, 1999 || Kitt Peak || Spacewatch || FLO || align=right data-sort-value="0.99" | 990 m || 
|-id=517 bgcolor=#fefefe
| 137517 ||  || — || November 4, 1999 || Kitt Peak || Spacewatch || — || align=right | 1.2 km || 
|-id=518 bgcolor=#fefefe
| 137518 ||  || — || November 4, 1999 || Kitt Peak || Spacewatch || NYS || align=right data-sort-value="0.77" | 770 m || 
|-id=519 bgcolor=#fefefe
| 137519 ||  || — || November 1, 1999 || Catalina || CSS || — || align=right | 1.2 km || 
|-id=520 bgcolor=#fefefe
| 137520 ||  || — || November 4, 1999 || Catalina || CSS || — || align=right | 1.4 km || 
|-id=521 bgcolor=#fefefe
| 137521 ||  || — || November 4, 1999 || Socorro || LINEAR || — || align=right | 1.4 km || 
|-id=522 bgcolor=#fefefe
| 137522 ||  || — || November 3, 1999 || Socorro || LINEAR || — || align=right | 1.6 km || 
|-id=523 bgcolor=#fefefe
| 137523 ||  || — || November 3, 1999 || Socorro || LINEAR || V || align=right | 1.2 km || 
|-id=524 bgcolor=#fefefe
| 137524 ||  || — || November 3, 1999 || Socorro || LINEAR || — || align=right | 1.0 km || 
|-id=525 bgcolor=#fefefe
| 137525 ||  || — || November 3, 1999 || Socorro || LINEAR || NYS || align=right data-sort-value="0.93" | 930 m || 
|-id=526 bgcolor=#fefefe
| 137526 ||  || — || November 3, 1999 || Socorro || LINEAR || FLO || align=right | 1.2 km || 
|-id=527 bgcolor=#fefefe
| 137527 ||  || — || November 3, 1999 || Socorro || LINEAR || — || align=right | 1.5 km || 
|-id=528 bgcolor=#fefefe
| 137528 ||  || — || November 4, 1999 || Socorro || LINEAR || — || align=right | 1.6 km || 
|-id=529 bgcolor=#fefefe
| 137529 ||  || — || November 4, 1999 || Socorro || LINEAR || NYS || align=right | 1.0 km || 
|-id=530 bgcolor=#fefefe
| 137530 ||  || — || November 4, 1999 || Socorro || LINEAR || — || align=right | 2.2 km || 
|-id=531 bgcolor=#fefefe
| 137531 ||  || — || November 4, 1999 || Socorro || LINEAR || V || align=right | 1.1 km || 
|-id=532 bgcolor=#d6d6d6
| 137532 ||  || — || November 4, 1999 || Socorro || LINEAR || 3:2 || align=right | 7.5 km || 
|-id=533 bgcolor=#fefefe
| 137533 ||  || — || November 4, 1999 || Socorro || LINEAR || — || align=right | 1.4 km || 
|-id=534 bgcolor=#fefefe
| 137534 ||  || — || November 4, 1999 || Socorro || LINEAR || V || align=right | 1.1 km || 
|-id=535 bgcolor=#fefefe
| 137535 ||  || — || November 4, 1999 || Socorro || LINEAR || MAS || align=right | 1.2 km || 
|-id=536 bgcolor=#fefefe
| 137536 ||  || — || November 4, 1999 || Socorro || LINEAR || — || align=right | 1.1 km || 
|-id=537 bgcolor=#fefefe
| 137537 ||  || — || November 4, 1999 || Socorro || LINEAR || V || align=right data-sort-value="0.92" | 920 m || 
|-id=538 bgcolor=#fefefe
| 137538 ||  || — || November 4, 1999 || Socorro || LINEAR || NYS || align=right | 1.1 km || 
|-id=539 bgcolor=#fefefe
| 137539 ||  || — || November 4, 1999 || Socorro || LINEAR || NYS || align=right | 1.1 km || 
|-id=540 bgcolor=#fefefe
| 137540 ||  || — || November 4, 1999 || Socorro || LINEAR || — || align=right | 1.0 km || 
|-id=541 bgcolor=#fefefe
| 137541 ||  || — || November 4, 1999 || Socorro || LINEAR || — || align=right | 1.1 km || 
|-id=542 bgcolor=#fefefe
| 137542 ||  || — || November 4, 1999 || Socorro || LINEAR || — || align=right | 1.3 km || 
|-id=543 bgcolor=#fefefe
| 137543 ||  || — || November 4, 1999 || Socorro || LINEAR || — || align=right | 1.1 km || 
|-id=544 bgcolor=#fefefe
| 137544 ||  || — || November 12, 1999 || Xinglong || SCAP || — || align=right | 1.7 km || 
|-id=545 bgcolor=#fefefe
| 137545 ||  || — || November 5, 1999 || Kitt Peak || Spacewatch || V || align=right data-sort-value="0.98" | 980 m || 
|-id=546 bgcolor=#fefefe
| 137546 ||  || — || November 5, 1999 || Kitt Peak || Spacewatch || — || align=right data-sort-value="0.97" | 970 m || 
|-id=547 bgcolor=#fefefe
| 137547 ||  || — || November 5, 1999 || Kitt Peak || Spacewatch || NYS || align=right data-sort-value="0.93" | 930 m || 
|-id=548 bgcolor=#fefefe
| 137548 ||  || — || November 5, 1999 || Kitt Peak || Spacewatch || — || align=right | 1.9 km || 
|-id=549 bgcolor=#fefefe
| 137549 ||  || — || November 3, 1999 || Socorro || LINEAR || — || align=right | 1.2 km || 
|-id=550 bgcolor=#fefefe
| 137550 ||  || — || November 4, 1999 || Socorro || LINEAR || V || align=right | 1.3 km || 
|-id=551 bgcolor=#fefefe
| 137551 ||  || — || November 6, 1999 || Kitt Peak || Spacewatch || — || align=right | 1.5 km || 
|-id=552 bgcolor=#fefefe
| 137552 ||  || — || November 6, 1999 || Kitt Peak || Spacewatch || V || align=right | 1.2 km || 
|-id=553 bgcolor=#fefefe
| 137553 ||  || — || November 4, 1999 || Socorro || LINEAR || FLO || align=right | 1.1 km || 
|-id=554 bgcolor=#fefefe
| 137554 ||  || — || November 4, 1999 || Socorro || LINEAR || ERI || align=right | 2.5 km || 
|-id=555 bgcolor=#fefefe
| 137555 ||  || — || November 4, 1999 || Socorro || LINEAR || NYS || align=right | 1.6 km || 
|-id=556 bgcolor=#fefefe
| 137556 ||  || — || November 4, 1999 || Socorro || LINEAR || — || align=right | 1.4 km || 
|-id=557 bgcolor=#fefefe
| 137557 ||  || — || November 4, 1999 || Socorro || LINEAR || NYS || align=right data-sort-value="0.92" | 920 m || 
|-id=558 bgcolor=#fefefe
| 137558 ||  || — || November 5, 1999 || Socorro || LINEAR || V || align=right | 1.1 km || 
|-id=559 bgcolor=#fefefe
| 137559 ||  || — || November 5, 1999 || Socorro || LINEAR || — || align=right | 1.1 km || 
|-id=560 bgcolor=#fefefe
| 137560 ||  || — || November 9, 1999 || Socorro || LINEAR || V || align=right | 1.2 km || 
|-id=561 bgcolor=#fefefe
| 137561 ||  || — || November 9, 1999 || Socorro || LINEAR || — || align=right | 2.6 km || 
|-id=562 bgcolor=#fefefe
| 137562 ||  || — || November 9, 1999 || Socorro || LINEAR || NYS || align=right | 1.1 km || 
|-id=563 bgcolor=#fefefe
| 137563 ||  || — || November 9, 1999 || Socorro || LINEAR || — || align=right | 1.1 km || 
|-id=564 bgcolor=#fefefe
| 137564 ||  || — || November 9, 1999 || Socorro || LINEAR || — || align=right | 1.2 km || 
|-id=565 bgcolor=#fefefe
| 137565 ||  || — || November 9, 1999 || Socorro || LINEAR || — || align=right | 1.6 km || 
|-id=566 bgcolor=#fefefe
| 137566 ||  || — || November 9, 1999 || Socorro || LINEAR || V || align=right data-sort-value="0.79" | 790 m || 
|-id=567 bgcolor=#fefefe
| 137567 ||  || — || November 9, 1999 || Socorro || LINEAR || NYS || align=right | 1.1 km || 
|-id=568 bgcolor=#fefefe
| 137568 ||  || — || November 9, 1999 || Socorro || LINEAR || — || align=right | 1.3 km || 
|-id=569 bgcolor=#fefefe
| 137569 ||  || — || November 9, 1999 || Socorro || LINEAR || — || align=right | 1.3 km || 
|-id=570 bgcolor=#fefefe
| 137570 ||  || — || November 9, 1999 || Socorro || LINEAR || — || align=right | 1.3 km || 
|-id=571 bgcolor=#fefefe
| 137571 ||  || — || November 9, 1999 || Socorro || LINEAR || FLO || align=right data-sort-value="0.81" | 810 m || 
|-id=572 bgcolor=#fefefe
| 137572 ||  || — || November 9, 1999 || Socorro || LINEAR || — || align=right | 1.2 km || 
|-id=573 bgcolor=#fefefe
| 137573 ||  || — || November 4, 1999 || Catalina || CSS || — || align=right | 1.7 km || 
|-id=574 bgcolor=#fefefe
| 137574 ||  || — || November 4, 1999 || Kitt Peak || Spacewatch || FLO || align=right | 1.2 km || 
|-id=575 bgcolor=#fefefe
| 137575 ||  || — || November 4, 1999 || Kitt Peak || Spacewatch || — || align=right | 1.2 km || 
|-id=576 bgcolor=#fefefe
| 137576 ||  || — || November 5, 1999 || Kitt Peak || Spacewatch || NYS || align=right data-sort-value="0.99" | 990 m || 
|-id=577 bgcolor=#fefefe
| 137577 ||  || — || November 6, 1999 || Kitt Peak || Spacewatch || NYS || align=right | 1.2 km || 
|-id=578 bgcolor=#fefefe
| 137578 ||  || — || November 9, 1999 || Kitt Peak || Spacewatch || — || align=right data-sort-value="0.94" | 940 m || 
|-id=579 bgcolor=#fefefe
| 137579 ||  || — || November 12, 1999 || Kitt Peak || Spacewatch || — || align=right | 1.0 km || 
|-id=580 bgcolor=#fefefe
| 137580 ||  || — || November 9, 1999 || Socorro || LINEAR || — || align=right | 1.7 km || 
|-id=581 bgcolor=#fefefe
| 137581 ||  || — || November 12, 1999 || Socorro || LINEAR || — || align=right | 1.5 km || 
|-id=582 bgcolor=#fefefe
| 137582 ||  || — || November 9, 1999 || Kitt Peak || Spacewatch || NYS || align=right | 1.1 km || 
|-id=583 bgcolor=#fefefe
| 137583 ||  || — || November 10, 1999 || Kitt Peak || Spacewatch || — || align=right | 1.5 km || 
|-id=584 bgcolor=#fefefe
| 137584 ||  || — || November 10, 1999 || Kitt Peak || Spacewatch || MAS || align=right | 1.1 km || 
|-id=585 bgcolor=#fefefe
| 137585 ||  || — || November 9, 1999 || Socorro || LINEAR || — || align=right | 1.1 km || 
|-id=586 bgcolor=#fefefe
| 137586 ||  || — || November 9, 1999 || Socorro || LINEAR || — || align=right | 1.2 km || 
|-id=587 bgcolor=#fefefe
| 137587 ||  || — || November 12, 1999 || Socorro || LINEAR || MAS || align=right | 1.4 km || 
|-id=588 bgcolor=#fefefe
| 137588 ||  || — || November 13, 1999 || Socorro || LINEAR || NYS || align=right data-sort-value="0.94" | 940 m || 
|-id=589 bgcolor=#fefefe
| 137589 ||  || — || November 14, 1999 || Socorro || LINEAR || — || align=right | 1.4 km || 
|-id=590 bgcolor=#fefefe
| 137590 ||  || — || November 14, 1999 || Socorro || LINEAR || NYS || align=right data-sort-value="0.92" | 920 m || 
|-id=591 bgcolor=#fefefe
| 137591 ||  || — || November 11, 1999 || Kitt Peak || Spacewatch || — || align=right | 1.2 km || 
|-id=592 bgcolor=#fefefe
| 137592 ||  || — || November 13, 1999 || Kitt Peak || Spacewatch || — || align=right | 1.1 km || 
|-id=593 bgcolor=#fefefe
| 137593 ||  || — || November 14, 1999 || Socorro || LINEAR || V || align=right | 1.2 km || 
|-id=594 bgcolor=#fefefe
| 137594 ||  || — || November 14, 1999 || Socorro || LINEAR || NYS || align=right | 1.6 km || 
|-id=595 bgcolor=#fefefe
| 137595 ||  || — || November 14, 1999 || Socorro || LINEAR || NYS || align=right | 1.00 km || 
|-id=596 bgcolor=#fefefe
| 137596 ||  || — || November 14, 1999 || Socorro || LINEAR || — || align=right | 1.4 km || 
|-id=597 bgcolor=#fefefe
| 137597 ||  || — || November 14, 1999 || Socorro || LINEAR || — || align=right | 1.4 km || 
|-id=598 bgcolor=#fefefe
| 137598 ||  || — || November 14, 1999 || Socorro || LINEAR || NYS || align=right | 1.4 km || 
|-id=599 bgcolor=#fefefe
| 137599 ||  || — || November 14, 1999 || Socorro || LINEAR || V || align=right | 1.2 km || 
|-id=600 bgcolor=#fefefe
| 137600 ||  || — || November 14, 1999 || Socorro || LINEAR || NYS || align=right data-sort-value="0.89" | 890 m || 
|}

137601–137700 

|-bgcolor=#fefefe
| 137601 ||  || — || November 14, 1999 || Socorro || LINEAR || NYS || align=right data-sort-value="0.85" | 850 m || 
|-id=602 bgcolor=#fefefe
| 137602 ||  || — || November 14, 1999 || Socorro || LINEAR || — || align=right | 1.5 km || 
|-id=603 bgcolor=#fefefe
| 137603 ||  || — || November 14, 1999 || Socorro || LINEAR || — || align=right | 1.3 km || 
|-id=604 bgcolor=#fefefe
| 137604 ||  || — || November 15, 1999 || Socorro || LINEAR || FLO || align=right data-sort-value="0.98" | 980 m || 
|-id=605 bgcolor=#fefefe
| 137605 ||  || — || November 11, 1999 || Anderson Mesa || LONEOS || PHO || align=right | 3.7 km || 
|-id=606 bgcolor=#fefefe
| 137606 ||  || — || November 10, 1999 || Kitt Peak || Spacewatch || — || align=right | 1.3 km || 
|-id=607 bgcolor=#fefefe
| 137607 ||  || — || November 2, 1999 || Catalina || CSS || — || align=right | 1.5 km || 
|-id=608 bgcolor=#fefefe
| 137608 ||  || — || November 5, 1999 || Socorro || LINEAR || — || align=right | 1.4 km || 
|-id=609 bgcolor=#fefefe
| 137609 ||  || — || November 5, 1999 || Socorro || LINEAR || FLO || align=right | 1.1 km || 
|-id=610 bgcolor=#fefefe
| 137610 ||  || — || November 9, 1999 || Socorro || LINEAR || NYS || align=right data-sort-value="0.99" | 990 m || 
|-id=611 bgcolor=#fefefe
| 137611 ||  || — || November 12, 1999 || Socorro || LINEAR || — || align=right | 1.3 km || 
|-id=612 bgcolor=#fefefe
| 137612 ||  || — || November 15, 1999 || Socorro || LINEAR || — || align=right | 1.8 km || 
|-id=613 bgcolor=#fefefe
| 137613 ||  || — || November 15, 1999 || Socorro || LINEAR || NYS || align=right | 1.1 km || 
|-id=614 bgcolor=#fefefe
| 137614 ||  || — || November 15, 1999 || Socorro || LINEAR || — || align=right | 2.7 km || 
|-id=615 bgcolor=#fefefe
| 137615 ||  || — || November 12, 1999 || Socorro || LINEAR || NYS || align=right | 1.2 km || 
|-id=616 bgcolor=#fefefe
| 137616 ||  || — || November 1, 1999 || Anderson Mesa || LONEOS || — || align=right | 1.8 km || 
|-id=617 bgcolor=#fefefe
| 137617 ||  || — || November 3, 1999 || Catalina || CSS || V || align=right | 1.7 km || 
|-id=618 bgcolor=#fefefe
| 137618 ||  || — || November 3, 1999 || Catalina || CSS || FLO || align=right | 1.2 km || 
|-id=619 bgcolor=#fefefe
| 137619 ||  || — || November 9, 1999 || Socorro || LINEAR || — || align=right | 1.1 km || 
|-id=620 bgcolor=#fefefe
| 137620 ||  || — || November 11, 1999 || Catalina || CSS || NYS || align=right | 2.8 km || 
|-id=621 bgcolor=#fefefe
| 137621 ||  || — || November 12, 1999 || Socorro || LINEAR || — || align=right | 1.1 km || 
|-id=622 bgcolor=#fefefe
| 137622 ||  || — || November 13, 1999 || Kitt Peak || Spacewatch || — || align=right | 1.5 km || 
|-id=623 bgcolor=#fefefe
| 137623 ||  || — || November 13, 1999 || Anderson Mesa || LONEOS || — || align=right | 2.2 km || 
|-id=624 bgcolor=#fefefe
| 137624 ||  || — || November 14, 1999 || Anderson Mesa || LONEOS || NYS || align=right | 1.4 km || 
|-id=625 bgcolor=#fefefe
| 137625 ||  || — || November 5, 1999 || Socorro || LINEAR || FLO || align=right | 1.2 km || 
|-id=626 bgcolor=#fefefe
| 137626 ||  || — || November 3, 1999 || Kitt Peak || Spacewatch || FLO || align=right | 1.0 km || 
|-id=627 bgcolor=#fefefe
| 137627 ||  || — || November 3, 1999 || Socorro || LINEAR || NYS || align=right data-sort-value="0.91" | 910 m || 
|-id=628 bgcolor=#fefefe
| 137628 ||  || — || November 4, 1999 || Kitt Peak || Spacewatch || NYS || align=right data-sort-value="0.81" | 810 m || 
|-id=629 bgcolor=#d6d6d6
| 137629 ||  || — || November 13, 1999 || Catalina || CSS || 7:4 || align=right | 8.8 km || 
|-id=630 bgcolor=#fefefe
| 137630 || 1999 WV || — || November 18, 1999 || Oohira || T. Urata || — || align=right | 1.4 km || 
|-id=631 bgcolor=#fefefe
| 137631 ||  || — || November 25, 1999 || Višnjan Observatory || K. Korlević || — || align=right | 1.8 km || 
|-id=632 bgcolor=#fefefe
| 137632 Ramsauer ||  ||  || November 26, 1999 || Linz || E. Meyer || — || align=right | 1.00 km || 
|-id=633 bgcolor=#fefefe
| 137633 ||  || — || November 26, 1999 || Monte Agliale || M. M. M. Santangelo || NYS || align=right | 1.2 km || 
|-id=634 bgcolor=#fefefe
| 137634 ||  || — || November 28, 1999 || Kitt Peak || Spacewatch || — || align=right | 1.5 km || 
|-id=635 bgcolor=#fefefe
| 137635 ||  || — || November 28, 1999 || Kvistaberg || UDAS || ERI || align=right | 3.1 km || 
|-id=636 bgcolor=#fefefe
| 137636 ||  || — || November 28, 1999 || Gnosca || S. Sposetti || — || align=right | 1.7 km || 
|-id=637 bgcolor=#fefefe
| 137637 ||  || — || November 28, 1999 || Kitt Peak || Spacewatch || — || align=right | 1.1 km || 
|-id=638 bgcolor=#fefefe
| 137638 ||  || — || November 28, 1999 || Kitt Peak || Spacewatch || — || align=right | 1.6 km || 
|-id=639 bgcolor=#fefefe
| 137639 ||  || — || November 28, 1999 || Kitt Peak || Spacewatch || NYS || align=right data-sort-value="0.84" | 840 m || 
|-id=640 bgcolor=#fefefe
| 137640 ||  || — || November 30, 1999 || Kitt Peak || Spacewatch || NYS || align=right | 1.1 km || 
|-id=641 bgcolor=#fefefe
| 137641 ||  || — || November 30, 1999 || Kitt Peak || Spacewatch || — || align=right | 1.3 km || 
|-id=642 bgcolor=#fefefe
| 137642 ||  || — || November 28, 1999 || Kitt Peak || Spacewatch || — || align=right | 1.0 km || 
|-id=643 bgcolor=#fefefe
| 137643 ||  || — || November 29, 1999 || Kitt Peak || Spacewatch || NYS || align=right data-sort-value="0.81" | 810 m || 
|-id=644 bgcolor=#fefefe
| 137644 ||  || — || November 29, 1999 || Kitt Peak || Spacewatch || — || align=right | 1.6 km || 
|-id=645 bgcolor=#fefefe
| 137645 ||  || — || November 29, 1999 || Kitt Peak || Spacewatch || — || align=right | 1.7 km || 
|-id=646 bgcolor=#fefefe
| 137646 ||  || — || November 29, 1999 || Kitt Peak || Spacewatch || MAS || align=right | 1.3 km || 
|-id=647 bgcolor=#fefefe
| 137647 ||  || — || November 30, 1999 || Kitt Peak || Spacewatch || NYS || align=right data-sort-value="0.87" | 870 m || 
|-id=648 bgcolor=#fefefe
| 137648 ||  || — || November 30, 1999 || Kitt Peak || Spacewatch || — || align=right | 1.2 km || 
|-id=649 bgcolor=#fefefe
| 137649 ||  || — || November 16, 1999 || Socorro || LINEAR || NYS || align=right data-sort-value="0.85" | 850 m || 
|-id=650 bgcolor=#fefefe
| 137650 ||  || — || November 28, 1999 || Kitt Peak || Spacewatch || — || align=right | 1.4 km || 
|-id=651 bgcolor=#fefefe
| 137651 ||  || — || November 29, 1999 || Kitt Peak || Spacewatch || — || align=right | 1.3 km || 
|-id=652 bgcolor=#fefefe
| 137652 ||  || — || November 29, 1999 || Kitt Peak || Spacewatch || FLO || align=right | 1.0 km || 
|-id=653 bgcolor=#fefefe
| 137653 || 1999 XY || — || December 2, 1999 || Oizumi || T. Kobayashi || ERI || align=right | 5.7 km || 
|-id=654 bgcolor=#fefefe
| 137654 ||  || — || December 3, 1999 || Kitt Peak || Spacewatch || NYS || align=right data-sort-value="0.95" | 950 m || 
|-id=655 bgcolor=#fefefe
| 137655 ||  || — || December 4, 1999 || Catalina || CSS || V || align=right | 1.9 km || 
|-id=656 bgcolor=#fefefe
| 137656 ||  || — || December 4, 1999 || Catalina || CSS || NYS || align=right | 1.2 km || 
|-id=657 bgcolor=#fefefe
| 137657 ||  || — || December 5, 1999 || Socorro || LINEAR || PHO || align=right | 2.2 km || 
|-id=658 bgcolor=#fefefe
| 137658 ||  || — || December 5, 1999 || Kitt Peak || Spacewatch || — || align=right | 1.3 km || 
|-id=659 bgcolor=#fefefe
| 137659 ||  || — || December 6, 1999 || Catalina || CSS || — || align=right | 2.9 km || 
|-id=660 bgcolor=#fefefe
| 137660 ||  || — || December 5, 1999 || Socorro || LINEAR || — || align=right | 1.8 km || 
|-id=661 bgcolor=#fefefe
| 137661 ||  || — || December 6, 1999 || Socorro || LINEAR || — || align=right | 2.2 km || 
|-id=662 bgcolor=#fefefe
| 137662 ||  || — || December 7, 1999 || Socorro || LINEAR || PHO || align=right | 4.0 km || 
|-id=663 bgcolor=#fefefe
| 137663 ||  || — || December 3, 1999 || Socorro || LINEAR || V || align=right | 1.3 km || 
|-id=664 bgcolor=#fefefe
| 137664 ||  || — || December 6, 1999 || Socorro || LINEAR || — || align=right | 1.6 km || 
|-id=665 bgcolor=#fefefe
| 137665 ||  || — || December 6, 1999 || Socorro || LINEAR || NYS || align=right | 1.0 km || 
|-id=666 bgcolor=#fefefe
| 137666 ||  || — || December 6, 1999 || Socorro || LINEAR || — || align=right | 2.4 km || 
|-id=667 bgcolor=#fefefe
| 137667 ||  || — || December 6, 1999 || Socorro || LINEAR || FLO || align=right | 1.0 km || 
|-id=668 bgcolor=#fefefe
| 137668 ||  || — || December 6, 1999 || Socorro || LINEAR || NYS || align=right | 1.2 km || 
|-id=669 bgcolor=#fefefe
| 137669 ||  || — || December 6, 1999 || Socorro || LINEAR || NYS || align=right | 1.00 km || 
|-id=670 bgcolor=#fefefe
| 137670 ||  || — || December 6, 1999 || Socorro || LINEAR || MAS || align=right | 1.9 km || 
|-id=671 bgcolor=#FFC2E0
| 137671 ||  || — || December 6, 1999 || Socorro || LINEAR || AMO || align=right data-sort-value="0.69" | 690 m || 
|-id=672 bgcolor=#fefefe
| 137672 ||  || — || December 7, 1999 || Socorro || LINEAR || PHO || align=right | 2.0 km || 
|-id=673 bgcolor=#fefefe
| 137673 ||  || — || December 7, 1999 || Socorro || LINEAR || NYS || align=right | 1.2 km || 
|-id=674 bgcolor=#fefefe
| 137674 ||  || — || December 7, 1999 || Socorro || LINEAR || — || align=right | 1.1 km || 
|-id=675 bgcolor=#fefefe
| 137675 ||  || — || December 7, 1999 || Socorro || LINEAR || NYS || align=right | 1.3 km || 
|-id=676 bgcolor=#fefefe
| 137676 ||  || — || December 7, 1999 || Socorro || LINEAR || NYS || align=right | 1.3 km || 
|-id=677 bgcolor=#fefefe
| 137677 ||  || — || December 7, 1999 || Socorro || LINEAR || NYS || align=right | 1.1 km || 
|-id=678 bgcolor=#fefefe
| 137678 ||  || — || December 7, 1999 || Socorro || LINEAR || — || align=right | 1.5 km || 
|-id=679 bgcolor=#fefefe
| 137679 ||  || — || December 7, 1999 || Socorro || LINEAR || NYS || align=right | 1.2 km || 
|-id=680 bgcolor=#fefefe
| 137680 ||  || — || December 7, 1999 || Socorro || LINEAR || NYS || align=right | 1.1 km || 
|-id=681 bgcolor=#fefefe
| 137681 ||  || — || December 7, 1999 || Socorro || LINEAR || V || align=right data-sort-value="0.95" | 950 m || 
|-id=682 bgcolor=#fefefe
| 137682 ||  || — || December 7, 1999 || Socorro || LINEAR || ERI || align=right | 3.5 km || 
|-id=683 bgcolor=#fefefe
| 137683 ||  || — || December 7, 1999 || Socorro || LINEAR || MAS || align=right | 1.1 km || 
|-id=684 bgcolor=#fefefe
| 137684 ||  || — || December 7, 1999 || Socorro || LINEAR || MAS || align=right data-sort-value="0.89" | 890 m || 
|-id=685 bgcolor=#fefefe
| 137685 ||  || — || December 7, 1999 || Socorro || LINEAR || NYS || align=right | 1.1 km || 
|-id=686 bgcolor=#E9E9E9
| 137686 ||  || — || December 7, 1999 || Socorro || LINEAR || — || align=right | 1.7 km || 
|-id=687 bgcolor=#fefefe
| 137687 ||  || — || December 7, 1999 || Socorro || LINEAR || — || align=right | 3.5 km || 
|-id=688 bgcolor=#fefefe
| 137688 ||  || — || December 7, 1999 || Socorro || LINEAR || NYS || align=right | 1.3 km || 
|-id=689 bgcolor=#fefefe
| 137689 ||  || — || December 7, 1999 || Socorro || LINEAR || MAS || align=right data-sort-value="0.87" | 870 m || 
|-id=690 bgcolor=#fefefe
| 137690 ||  || — || December 7, 1999 || Socorro || LINEAR || — || align=right | 1.3 km || 
|-id=691 bgcolor=#fefefe
| 137691 ||  || — || December 7, 1999 || Socorro || LINEAR || EUT || align=right | 1.3 km || 
|-id=692 bgcolor=#E9E9E9
| 137692 ||  || — || December 7, 1999 || Socorro || LINEAR || — || align=right | 2.3 km || 
|-id=693 bgcolor=#fefefe
| 137693 ||  || — || December 7, 1999 || Socorro || LINEAR || MAS || align=right data-sort-value="0.93" | 930 m || 
|-id=694 bgcolor=#fefefe
| 137694 ||  || — || December 7, 1999 || Socorro || LINEAR || NYS || align=right data-sort-value="0.96" | 960 m || 
|-id=695 bgcolor=#fefefe
| 137695 ||  || — || December 7, 1999 || Socorro || LINEAR || — || align=right | 1.3 km || 
|-id=696 bgcolor=#fefefe
| 137696 ||  || — || December 7, 1999 || Socorro || LINEAR || NYS || align=right | 1.1 km || 
|-id=697 bgcolor=#fefefe
| 137697 ||  || — || December 7, 1999 || Socorro || LINEAR || — || align=right | 1.3 km || 
|-id=698 bgcolor=#fefefe
| 137698 ||  || — || December 7, 1999 || Socorro || LINEAR || — || align=right | 1.4 km || 
|-id=699 bgcolor=#fefefe
| 137699 ||  || — || December 7, 1999 || Socorro || LINEAR || — || align=right | 2.0 km || 
|-id=700 bgcolor=#fefefe
| 137700 ||  || — || December 7, 1999 || Socorro || LINEAR || — || align=right | 1.2 km || 
|}

137701–137800 

|-bgcolor=#fefefe
| 137701 ||  || — || December 7, 1999 || Socorro || LINEAR || — || align=right | 1.6 km || 
|-id=702 bgcolor=#fefefe
| 137702 ||  || — || December 7, 1999 || Socorro || LINEAR || — || align=right | 1.8 km || 
|-id=703 bgcolor=#fefefe
| 137703 ||  || — || December 7, 1999 || Socorro || LINEAR || NYS || align=right | 1.5 km || 
|-id=704 bgcolor=#fefefe
| 137704 ||  || — || December 7, 1999 || Socorro || LINEAR || FLO || align=right | 3.5 km || 
|-id=705 bgcolor=#fefefe
| 137705 ||  || — || December 7, 1999 || Socorro || LINEAR || — || align=right | 1.5 km || 
|-id=706 bgcolor=#fefefe
| 137706 ||  || — || December 7, 1999 || Socorro || LINEAR || NYS || align=right | 1.1 km || 
|-id=707 bgcolor=#fefefe
| 137707 ||  || — || December 7, 1999 || Socorro || LINEAR || NYS || align=right | 1.8 km || 
|-id=708 bgcolor=#fefefe
| 137708 ||  || — || December 7, 1999 || Socorro || LINEAR || V || align=right | 1.2 km || 
|-id=709 bgcolor=#fefefe
| 137709 ||  || — || December 7, 1999 || Socorro || LINEAR || — || align=right | 1.7 km || 
|-id=710 bgcolor=#fefefe
| 137710 ||  || — || December 7, 1999 || Socorro || LINEAR || — || align=right | 2.2 km || 
|-id=711 bgcolor=#fefefe
| 137711 ||  || — || December 7, 1999 || Socorro || LINEAR || — || align=right | 2.0 km || 
|-id=712 bgcolor=#fefefe
| 137712 ||  || — || December 7, 1999 || Socorro || LINEAR || — || align=right | 1.3 km || 
|-id=713 bgcolor=#fefefe
| 137713 ||  || — || December 7, 1999 || Socorro || LINEAR || — || align=right | 1.9 km || 
|-id=714 bgcolor=#fefefe
| 137714 ||  || — || December 7, 1999 || Socorro || LINEAR || — || align=right | 1.5 km || 
|-id=715 bgcolor=#fefefe
| 137715 ||  || — || December 7, 1999 || Socorro || LINEAR || — || align=right | 2.0 km || 
|-id=716 bgcolor=#fefefe
| 137716 ||  || — || December 7, 1999 || Socorro || LINEAR || NYS || align=right | 1.2 km || 
|-id=717 bgcolor=#fefefe
| 137717 ||  || — || December 7, 1999 || Socorro || LINEAR || — || align=right | 1.7 km || 
|-id=718 bgcolor=#fefefe
| 137718 ||  || — || December 7, 1999 || Socorro || LINEAR || — || align=right | 1.7 km || 
|-id=719 bgcolor=#fefefe
| 137719 ||  || — || December 7, 1999 || Socorro || LINEAR || NYS || align=right | 1.1 km || 
|-id=720 bgcolor=#fefefe
| 137720 ||  || — || December 7, 1999 || Socorro || LINEAR || NYS || align=right | 1.5 km || 
|-id=721 bgcolor=#fefefe
| 137721 ||  || — || December 7, 1999 || Socorro || LINEAR || NYS || align=right | 1.3 km || 
|-id=722 bgcolor=#FA8072
| 137722 ||  || — || December 7, 1999 || Socorro || LINEAR || — || align=right | 1.9 km || 
|-id=723 bgcolor=#fefefe
| 137723 ||  || — || December 4, 1999 || Catalina || CSS || — || align=right | 2.1 km || 
|-id=724 bgcolor=#fefefe
| 137724 ||  || — || December 7, 1999 || Socorro || LINEAR || — || align=right | 1.2 km || 
|-id=725 bgcolor=#fefefe
| 137725 ||  || — || December 7, 1999 || Socorro || LINEAR || MAS || align=right | 1.1 km || 
|-id=726 bgcolor=#fefefe
| 137726 ||  || — || December 4, 1999 || Catalina || CSS || — || align=right | 1.3 km || 
|-id=727 bgcolor=#fefefe
| 137727 ||  || — || December 5, 1999 || Catalina || CSS || FLO || align=right | 1.5 km || 
|-id=728 bgcolor=#fefefe
| 137728 ||  || — || December 5, 1999 || Catalina || CSS || — || align=right | 1.5 km || 
|-id=729 bgcolor=#fefefe
| 137729 ||  || — || December 5, 1999 || Catalina || CSS || NYS || align=right data-sort-value="0.99" | 990 m || 
|-id=730 bgcolor=#fefefe
| 137730 ||  || — || December 5, 1999 || Catalina || CSS || NYS || align=right | 1.2 km || 
|-id=731 bgcolor=#fefefe
| 137731 ||  || — || December 7, 1999 || Catalina || CSS || — || align=right | 1.7 km || 
|-id=732 bgcolor=#fefefe
| 137732 ||  || — || December 7, 1999 || Catalina || CSS || FLO || align=right | 1.2 km || 
|-id=733 bgcolor=#fefefe
| 137733 ||  || — || December 7, 1999 || Catalina || CSS || — || align=right | 3.0 km || 
|-id=734 bgcolor=#fefefe
| 137734 ||  || — || December 7, 1999 || Catalina || CSS || V || align=right | 1.4 km || 
|-id=735 bgcolor=#fefefe
| 137735 ||  || — || December 7, 1999 || Catalina || CSS || — || align=right | 3.7 km || 
|-id=736 bgcolor=#fefefe
| 137736 ||  || — || December 7, 1999 || Catalina || CSS || V || align=right | 1.2 km || 
|-id=737 bgcolor=#fefefe
| 137737 ||  || — || December 7, 1999 || Socorro || LINEAR || NYS || align=right data-sort-value="0.90" | 900 m || 
|-id=738 bgcolor=#fefefe
| 137738 ||  || — || December 12, 1999 || Socorro || LINEAR || — || align=right | 4.9 km || 
|-id=739 bgcolor=#fefefe
| 137739 ||  || — || December 12, 1999 || Socorro || LINEAR || — || align=right | 1.9 km || 
|-id=740 bgcolor=#fefefe
| 137740 ||  || — || December 12, 1999 || Socorro || LINEAR || V || align=right data-sort-value="0.98" | 980 m || 
|-id=741 bgcolor=#fefefe
| 137741 ||  || — || December 6, 1999 || Socorro || LINEAR || — || align=right | 2.3 km || 
|-id=742 bgcolor=#fefefe
| 137742 ||  || — || December 13, 1999 || Socorro || LINEAR || PHO || align=right | 2.3 km || 
|-id=743 bgcolor=#fefefe
| 137743 ||  || — || December 2, 1999 || Kitt Peak || Spacewatch || V || align=right data-sort-value="0.88" | 880 m || 
|-id=744 bgcolor=#fefefe
| 137744 ||  || — || December 5, 1999 || Kitt Peak || Spacewatch || V || align=right | 1.2 km || 
|-id=745 bgcolor=#fefefe
| 137745 ||  || — || December 12, 1999 || Socorro || LINEAR || PHO || align=right | 2.4 km || 
|-id=746 bgcolor=#fefefe
| 137746 ||  || — || December 7, 1999 || Socorro || LINEAR || — || align=right | 1.5 km || 
|-id=747 bgcolor=#fefefe
| 137747 ||  || — || December 8, 1999 || Socorro || LINEAR || ERI || align=right | 4.1 km || 
|-id=748 bgcolor=#fefefe
| 137748 ||  || — || December 8, 1999 || Socorro || LINEAR || NYS || align=right | 1.1 km || 
|-id=749 bgcolor=#fefefe
| 137749 ||  || — || December 8, 1999 || Socorro || LINEAR || — || align=right | 1.3 km || 
|-id=750 bgcolor=#fefefe
| 137750 ||  || — || December 8, 1999 || Socorro || LINEAR || FLO || align=right | 1.6 km || 
|-id=751 bgcolor=#fefefe
| 137751 ||  || — || December 8, 1999 || Socorro || LINEAR || FLO || align=right | 2.1 km || 
|-id=752 bgcolor=#fefefe
| 137752 ||  || — || December 8, 1999 || Socorro || LINEAR || — || align=right | 1.3 km || 
|-id=753 bgcolor=#fefefe
| 137753 ||  || — || December 13, 1999 || Socorro || LINEAR || — || align=right | 1.8 km || 
|-id=754 bgcolor=#E9E9E9
| 137754 ||  || — || December 8, 1999 || Kitt Peak || Spacewatch || — || align=right | 1.7 km || 
|-id=755 bgcolor=#fefefe
| 137755 ||  || — || December 8, 1999 || Socorro || LINEAR || NYS || align=right | 1.2 km || 
|-id=756 bgcolor=#fefefe
| 137756 ||  || — || December 10, 1999 || Socorro || LINEAR || FLO || align=right | 1.9 km || 
|-id=757 bgcolor=#fefefe
| 137757 ||  || — || December 10, 1999 || Socorro || LINEAR || — || align=right | 1.5 km || 
|-id=758 bgcolor=#fefefe
| 137758 ||  || — || December 10, 1999 || Socorro || LINEAR || FLO || align=right | 1.9 km || 
|-id=759 bgcolor=#fefefe
| 137759 ||  || — || December 10, 1999 || Socorro || LINEAR || — || align=right | 1.7 km || 
|-id=760 bgcolor=#fefefe
| 137760 ||  || — || December 10, 1999 || Socorro || LINEAR || — || align=right | 1.8 km || 
|-id=761 bgcolor=#E9E9E9
| 137761 ||  || — || December 10, 1999 || Socorro || LINEAR || — || align=right | 3.2 km || 
|-id=762 bgcolor=#fefefe
| 137762 ||  || — || December 10, 1999 || Socorro || LINEAR || — || align=right | 2.0 km || 
|-id=763 bgcolor=#fefefe
| 137763 ||  || — || December 10, 1999 || Socorro || LINEAR || — || align=right | 1.8 km || 
|-id=764 bgcolor=#fefefe
| 137764 ||  || — || December 10, 1999 || Socorro || LINEAR || V || align=right | 1.3 km || 
|-id=765 bgcolor=#fefefe
| 137765 ||  || — || December 12, 1999 || Socorro || LINEAR || — || align=right | 1.9 km || 
|-id=766 bgcolor=#d6d6d6
| 137766 ||  || — || December 12, 1999 || Socorro || LINEAR || TRP || align=right | 4.2 km || 
|-id=767 bgcolor=#fefefe
| 137767 ||  || — || December 12, 1999 || Socorro || LINEAR || FLO || align=right | 1.4 km || 
|-id=768 bgcolor=#fefefe
| 137768 ||  || — || December 12, 1999 || Socorro || LINEAR || — || align=right | 2.5 km || 
|-id=769 bgcolor=#fefefe
| 137769 ||  || — || December 12, 1999 || Socorro || LINEAR || — || align=right | 3.6 km || 
|-id=770 bgcolor=#fefefe
| 137770 ||  || — || December 12, 1999 || Socorro || LINEAR || V || align=right | 1.6 km || 
|-id=771 bgcolor=#fefefe
| 137771 ||  || — || December 12, 1999 || Socorro || LINEAR || ERI || align=right | 2.6 km || 
|-id=772 bgcolor=#fefefe
| 137772 ||  || — || December 12, 1999 || Socorro || LINEAR || V || align=right | 1.7 km || 
|-id=773 bgcolor=#fefefe
| 137773 ||  || — || December 13, 1999 || Kitt Peak || Spacewatch || — || align=right | 1.2 km || 
|-id=774 bgcolor=#fefefe
| 137774 ||  || — || December 13, 1999 || Kitt Peak || Spacewatch || MAS || align=right | 1.0 km || 
|-id=775 bgcolor=#E9E9E9
| 137775 ||  || — || December 13, 1999 || Kitt Peak || Spacewatch || — || align=right | 1.5 km || 
|-id=776 bgcolor=#fefefe
| 137776 ||  || — || December 13, 1999 || Kitt Peak || Spacewatch || MAS || align=right | 1.2 km || 
|-id=777 bgcolor=#fefefe
| 137777 ||  || — || December 13, 1999 || Kitt Peak || Spacewatch || — || align=right | 1.8 km || 
|-id=778 bgcolor=#fefefe
| 137778 ||  || — || December 12, 1999 || Socorro || LINEAR || — || align=right | 1.5 km || 
|-id=779 bgcolor=#fefefe
| 137779 ||  || — || December 15, 1999 || Socorro || LINEAR || FLO || align=right | 1.2 km || 
|-id=780 bgcolor=#fefefe
| 137780 ||  || — || December 13, 1999 || Kitt Peak || Spacewatch || — || align=right | 1.4 km || 
|-id=781 bgcolor=#fefefe
| 137781 ||  || — || December 13, 1999 || Kitt Peak || Spacewatch || — || align=right | 2.1 km || 
|-id=782 bgcolor=#fefefe
| 137782 ||  || — || December 14, 1999 || Kitt Peak || Spacewatch || — || align=right | 1.8 km || 
|-id=783 bgcolor=#fefefe
| 137783 ||  || — || December 14, 1999 || Kitt Peak || Spacewatch || NYS || align=right | 1.1 km || 
|-id=784 bgcolor=#fefefe
| 137784 ||  || — || December 14, 1999 || Kitt Peak || Spacewatch || NYS || align=right | 1.1 km || 
|-id=785 bgcolor=#fefefe
| 137785 ||  || — || December 4, 1999 || Anderson Mesa || LONEOS || — || align=right | 1.4 km || 
|-id=786 bgcolor=#fefefe
| 137786 ||  || — || December 5, 1999 || Kitt Peak || Spacewatch || NYS || align=right data-sort-value="0.93" | 930 m || 
|-id=787 bgcolor=#d6d6d6
| 137787 ||  || — || December 5, 1999 || Catalina || CSS || — || align=right | 3.0 km || 
|-id=788 bgcolor=#fefefe
| 137788 ||  || — || December 4, 1999 || Kitt Peak || Spacewatch || V || align=right | 1.3 km || 
|-id=789 bgcolor=#fefefe
| 137789 ||  || — || December 5, 1999 || Catalina || CSS || FLO || align=right | 1.4 km || 
|-id=790 bgcolor=#fefefe
| 137790 ||  || — || December 7, 1999 || Catalina || CSS || — || align=right | 1.3 km || 
|-id=791 bgcolor=#E9E9E9
| 137791 ||  || — || December 13, 1999 || Socorro || LINEAR || — || align=right | 2.4 km || 
|-id=792 bgcolor=#fefefe
| 137792 ||  || — || December 5, 1999 || Socorro || LINEAR || — || align=right | 1.2 km || 
|-id=793 bgcolor=#fefefe
| 137793 ||  || — || December 5, 1999 || Kitt Peak || Spacewatch || NYS || align=right | 1.2 km || 
|-id=794 bgcolor=#fefefe
| 137794 ||  || — || December 9, 1999 || Kitt Peak || Spacewatch || — || align=right | 1.4 km || 
|-id=795 bgcolor=#fefefe
| 137795 ||  || — || December 12, 1999 || Kitt Peak || Spacewatch || — || align=right | 1.4 km || 
|-id=796 bgcolor=#fefefe
| 137796 ||  || — || December 12, 1999 || Kitt Peak || Spacewatch || MAS || align=right | 1.0 km || 
|-id=797 bgcolor=#fefefe
| 137797 ||  || — || December 4, 1999 || Kitt Peak || Spacewatch || — || align=right | 1.5 km || 
|-id=798 bgcolor=#fefefe
| 137798 ||  || — || December 7, 1999 || Socorro || LINEAR || — || align=right | 1.4 km || 
|-id=799 bgcolor=#FFC2E0
| 137799 || 1999 YB || — || December 16, 1999 || Anderson Mesa || LONEOS || AMO || align=right data-sort-value="0.69" | 690 m || 
|-id=800 bgcolor=#fefefe
| 137800 || 1999 YE || — || December 16, 1999 || Socorro || LINEAR || PHO || align=right | 2.5 km || 
|}

137801–137900 

|-bgcolor=#fefefe
| 137801 || 1999 YR || — || December 16, 1999 || Socorro || LINEAR || PHO || align=right | 2.3 km || 
|-id=802 bgcolor=#FFC2E0
| 137802 || 1999 YT || — || December 16, 1999 || Socorro || LINEAR || AMO +1km || align=right | 1.4 km || 
|-id=803 bgcolor=#fefefe
| 137803 ||  || — || December 16, 1999 || Socorro || LINEAR || — || align=right | 1.5 km || 
|-id=804 bgcolor=#fefefe
| 137804 ||  || — || December 16, 1999 || Kitt Peak || Spacewatch || — || align=right | 1.3 km || 
|-id=805 bgcolor=#FFC2E0
| 137805 ||  || — || December 28, 1999 || Socorro || LINEAR || ATE +1km || align=right | 2.2 km || 
|-id=806 bgcolor=#fefefe
| 137806 ||  || — || December 30, 1999 || Socorro || LINEAR || PHO || align=right | 2.0 km || 
|-id=807 bgcolor=#fefefe
| 137807 ||  || — || December 30, 1999 || Socorro || LINEAR || — || align=right | 2.0 km || 
|-id=808 bgcolor=#fefefe
| 137808 ||  || — || December 27, 1999 || Kitt Peak || Spacewatch || FLO || align=right | 1.0 km || 
|-id=809 bgcolor=#fefefe
| 137809 ||  || — || December 27, 1999 || Kitt Peak || Spacewatch || — || align=right | 1.3 km || 
|-id=810 bgcolor=#fefefe
| 137810 ||  || — || December 27, 1999 || Kitt Peak || Spacewatch || — || align=right | 1.7 km || 
|-id=811 bgcolor=#fefefe
| 137811 ||  || — || December 31, 1999 || Kitt Peak || Spacewatch || NYS || align=right | 1.3 km || 
|-id=812 bgcolor=#fefefe
| 137812 ||  || — || December 31, 1999 || Farpoint || G. Hug, G. Bell || FLO || align=right | 1.1 km || 
|-id=813 bgcolor=#fefefe
| 137813 ||  || — || December 31, 1999 || Kitt Peak || Spacewatch || NYS || align=right | 1.1 km || 
|-id=814 bgcolor=#fefefe
| 137814 ||  || — || December 31, 1999 || Kitt Peak || Spacewatch || V || align=right | 1.3 km || 
|-id=815 bgcolor=#fefefe
| 137815 ||  || — || December 16, 1999 || Kitt Peak || Spacewatch || NYS || align=right data-sort-value="0.79" | 790 m || 
|-id=816 bgcolor=#d6d6d6
| 137816 ||  || — || December 27, 1999 || Kitt Peak || Spacewatch || 3:2 || align=right | 8.3 km || 
|-id=817 bgcolor=#fefefe
| 137817 ||  || — || January 2, 2000 || Kitt Peak || Spacewatch || MAS || align=right | 1.2 km || 
|-id=818 bgcolor=#fefefe
| 137818 ||  || — || January 2, 2000 || Socorro || LINEAR || — || align=right | 2.9 km || 
|-id=819 bgcolor=#fefefe
| 137819 ||  || — || January 3, 2000 || Socorro || LINEAR || — || align=right | 1.5 km || 
|-id=820 bgcolor=#fefefe
| 137820 ||  || — || January 4, 2000 || Prescott || P. G. Comba || EUT || align=right | 1.2 km || 
|-id=821 bgcolor=#fefefe
| 137821 ||  || — || January 2, 2000 || Socorro || LINEAR || — || align=right | 1.5 km || 
|-id=822 bgcolor=#fefefe
| 137822 ||  || — || January 3, 2000 || Socorro || LINEAR || — || align=right | 1.4 km || 
|-id=823 bgcolor=#fefefe
| 137823 ||  || — || January 3, 2000 || Socorro || LINEAR || NYS || align=right | 1.1 km || 
|-id=824 bgcolor=#fefefe
| 137824 ||  || — || January 3, 2000 || Socorro || LINEAR || — || align=right | 1.6 km || 
|-id=825 bgcolor=#fefefe
| 137825 ||  || — || January 3, 2000 || Socorro || LINEAR || — || align=right | 1.8 km || 
|-id=826 bgcolor=#fefefe
| 137826 ||  || — || January 3, 2000 || Socorro || LINEAR || ERI || align=right | 4.3 km || 
|-id=827 bgcolor=#fefefe
| 137827 ||  || — || January 3, 2000 || Socorro || LINEAR || NYS || align=right | 1.6 km || 
|-id=828 bgcolor=#fefefe
| 137828 ||  || — || January 3, 2000 || Socorro || LINEAR || V || align=right | 1.2 km || 
|-id=829 bgcolor=#fefefe
| 137829 ||  || — || January 3, 2000 || Socorro || LINEAR || — || align=right | 1.5 km || 
|-id=830 bgcolor=#fefefe
| 137830 ||  || — || January 3, 2000 || Socorro || LINEAR || MAS || align=right | 2.0 km || 
|-id=831 bgcolor=#fefefe
| 137831 ||  || — || January 3, 2000 || Socorro || LINEAR || NYS || align=right | 1.3 km || 
|-id=832 bgcolor=#fefefe
| 137832 ||  || — || January 3, 2000 || Socorro || LINEAR || NYS || align=right | 2.4 km || 
|-id=833 bgcolor=#fefefe
| 137833 ||  || — || January 3, 2000 || Socorro || LINEAR || NYS || align=right | 1.1 km || 
|-id=834 bgcolor=#fefefe
| 137834 ||  || — || January 3, 2000 || Socorro || LINEAR || MAS || align=right | 1.2 km || 
|-id=835 bgcolor=#E9E9E9
| 137835 ||  || — || January 3, 2000 || Socorro || LINEAR || — || align=right | 2.1 km || 
|-id=836 bgcolor=#fefefe
| 137836 ||  || — || January 3, 2000 || Socorro || LINEAR || NYS || align=right | 1.2 km || 
|-id=837 bgcolor=#E9E9E9
| 137837 ||  || — || January 3, 2000 || Socorro || LINEAR || — || align=right | 2.6 km || 
|-id=838 bgcolor=#fefefe
| 137838 ||  || — || January 3, 2000 || Socorro || LINEAR || — || align=right | 1.5 km || 
|-id=839 bgcolor=#fefefe
| 137839 ||  || — || January 3, 2000 || Socorro || LINEAR || NYS || align=right | 1.5 km || 
|-id=840 bgcolor=#fefefe
| 137840 ||  || — || January 3, 2000 || Socorro || LINEAR || — || align=right | 1.9 km || 
|-id=841 bgcolor=#fefefe
| 137841 ||  || — || January 3, 2000 || Socorro || LINEAR || — || align=right | 1.4 km || 
|-id=842 bgcolor=#fefefe
| 137842 ||  || — || January 3, 2000 || Socorro || LINEAR || V || align=right | 1.4 km || 
|-id=843 bgcolor=#E9E9E9
| 137843 ||  || — || January 3, 2000 || Socorro || LINEAR || — || align=right | 2.8 km || 
|-id=844 bgcolor=#fefefe
| 137844 ||  || — || January 3, 2000 || Socorro || LINEAR || V || align=right | 1.9 km || 
|-id=845 bgcolor=#fefefe
| 137845 ||  || — || January 3, 2000 || Socorro || LINEAR || NYS || align=right | 1.0 km || 
|-id=846 bgcolor=#fefefe
| 137846 ||  || — || January 3, 2000 || Socorro || LINEAR || — || align=right | 2.1 km || 
|-id=847 bgcolor=#fefefe
| 137847 ||  || — || January 2, 2000 || Kitt Peak || Spacewatch || NYS || align=right | 1.1 km || 
|-id=848 bgcolor=#fefefe
| 137848 ||  || — || January 3, 2000 || Socorro || LINEAR || — || align=right | 1.5 km || 
|-id=849 bgcolor=#fefefe
| 137849 ||  || — || January 6, 2000 || Prescott || P. G. Comba || — || align=right | 1.2 km || 
|-id=850 bgcolor=#fefefe
| 137850 ||  || — || January 4, 2000 || Socorro || LINEAR || — || align=right | 2.0 km || 
|-id=851 bgcolor=#fefefe
| 137851 ||  || — || January 4, 2000 || Socorro || LINEAR || — || align=right | 1.4 km || 
|-id=852 bgcolor=#fefefe
| 137852 ||  || — || January 4, 2000 || Socorro || LINEAR || FLO || align=right | 1.4 km || 
|-id=853 bgcolor=#fefefe
| 137853 ||  || — || January 4, 2000 || Socorro || LINEAR || — || align=right | 2.0 km || 
|-id=854 bgcolor=#fefefe
| 137854 ||  || — || January 4, 2000 || Socorro || LINEAR || — || align=right | 2.7 km || 
|-id=855 bgcolor=#fefefe
| 137855 ||  || — || January 4, 2000 || Socorro || LINEAR || V || align=right | 1.8 km || 
|-id=856 bgcolor=#E9E9E9
| 137856 ||  || — || January 4, 2000 || Socorro || LINEAR || — || align=right | 1.7 km || 
|-id=857 bgcolor=#fefefe
| 137857 ||  || — || January 4, 2000 || Socorro || LINEAR || NYS || align=right | 1.7 km || 
|-id=858 bgcolor=#fefefe
| 137858 ||  || — || January 4, 2000 || Socorro || LINEAR || — || align=right | 1.6 km || 
|-id=859 bgcolor=#fefefe
| 137859 ||  || — || January 4, 2000 || Socorro || LINEAR || V || align=right | 1.6 km || 
|-id=860 bgcolor=#E9E9E9
| 137860 ||  || — || January 4, 2000 || Socorro || LINEAR || — || align=right | 2.2 km || 
|-id=861 bgcolor=#fefefe
| 137861 ||  || — || January 4, 2000 || Socorro || LINEAR || — || align=right | 1.8 km || 
|-id=862 bgcolor=#fefefe
| 137862 ||  || — || January 4, 2000 || Socorro || LINEAR || — || align=right | 1.4 km || 
|-id=863 bgcolor=#fefefe
| 137863 ||  || — || January 4, 2000 || Socorro || LINEAR || ERI || align=right | 3.7 km || 
|-id=864 bgcolor=#fefefe
| 137864 ||  || — || January 5, 2000 || Socorro || LINEAR || NYS || align=right | 1.7 km || 
|-id=865 bgcolor=#fefefe
| 137865 ||  || — || January 5, 2000 || Socorro || LINEAR || — || align=right | 1.3 km || 
|-id=866 bgcolor=#fefefe
| 137866 ||  || — || January 5, 2000 || Socorro || LINEAR || MAS || align=right | 1.4 km || 
|-id=867 bgcolor=#fefefe
| 137867 ||  || — || January 5, 2000 || Socorro || LINEAR || MAS || align=right | 1.2 km || 
|-id=868 bgcolor=#fefefe
| 137868 ||  || — || January 5, 2000 || Socorro || LINEAR || — || align=right | 1.9 km || 
|-id=869 bgcolor=#fefefe
| 137869 ||  || — || January 5, 2000 || Socorro || LINEAR || NYS || align=right | 1.2 km || 
|-id=870 bgcolor=#fefefe
| 137870 ||  || — || January 5, 2000 || Socorro || LINEAR || NYS || align=right | 1.2 km || 
|-id=871 bgcolor=#fefefe
| 137871 ||  || — || January 5, 2000 || Socorro || LINEAR || MAS || align=right | 1.4 km || 
|-id=872 bgcolor=#E9E9E9
| 137872 ||  || — || January 5, 2000 || Socorro || LINEAR || — || align=right | 3.0 km || 
|-id=873 bgcolor=#fefefe
| 137873 ||  || — || January 5, 2000 || Socorro || LINEAR || — || align=right | 1.4 km || 
|-id=874 bgcolor=#fefefe
| 137874 ||  || — || January 7, 2000 || Oaxaca || J. M. Roe || — || align=right | 1.7 km || 
|-id=875 bgcolor=#E9E9E9
| 137875 ||  || — || January 4, 2000 || Socorro || LINEAR || — || align=right | 2.4 km || 
|-id=876 bgcolor=#fefefe
| 137876 ||  || — || January 5, 2000 || Socorro || LINEAR || — || align=right | 1.6 km || 
|-id=877 bgcolor=#fefefe
| 137877 ||  || — || January 5, 2000 || Socorro || LINEAR || — || align=right | 1.6 km || 
|-id=878 bgcolor=#fefefe
| 137878 ||  || — || January 5, 2000 || Socorro || LINEAR || NYS || align=right | 1.2 km || 
|-id=879 bgcolor=#C2FFFF
| 137879 ||  || — || January 5, 2000 || Socorro || LINEAR || L4 || align=right | 23 km || 
|-id=880 bgcolor=#fefefe
| 137880 ||  || — || January 5, 2000 || Socorro || LINEAR || — || align=right | 1.8 km || 
|-id=881 bgcolor=#fefefe
| 137881 ||  || — || January 5, 2000 || Socorro || LINEAR || — || align=right | 2.3 km || 
|-id=882 bgcolor=#fefefe
| 137882 ||  || — || January 5, 2000 || Socorro || LINEAR || V || align=right | 1.5 km || 
|-id=883 bgcolor=#fefefe
| 137883 ||  || — || January 5, 2000 || Socorro || LINEAR || — || align=right | 1.8 km || 
|-id=884 bgcolor=#E9E9E9
| 137884 ||  || — || January 5, 2000 || Socorro || LINEAR || HNS || align=right | 2.8 km || 
|-id=885 bgcolor=#fefefe
| 137885 ||  || — || January 5, 2000 || Socorro || LINEAR || — || align=right | 1.4 km || 
|-id=886 bgcolor=#fefefe
| 137886 ||  || — || January 4, 2000 || Socorro || LINEAR || — || align=right | 1.6 km || 
|-id=887 bgcolor=#fefefe
| 137887 ||  || — || January 4, 2000 || Socorro || LINEAR || — || align=right | 1.5 km || 
|-id=888 bgcolor=#fefefe
| 137888 ||  || — || January 4, 2000 || Socorro || LINEAR || — || align=right | 1.6 km || 
|-id=889 bgcolor=#E9E9E9
| 137889 ||  || — || January 4, 2000 || Socorro || LINEAR || — || align=right | 2.6 km || 
|-id=890 bgcolor=#fefefe
| 137890 ||  || — || January 4, 2000 || Oizumi || T. Kobayashi || — || align=right | 2.0 km || 
|-id=891 bgcolor=#fefefe
| 137891 ||  || — || January 7, 2000 || Socorro || LINEAR || — || align=right | 3.7 km || 
|-id=892 bgcolor=#fefefe
| 137892 ||  || — || January 3, 2000 || Socorro || LINEAR || — || align=right | 2.0 km || 
|-id=893 bgcolor=#fefefe
| 137893 ||  || — || January 3, 2000 || Socorro || LINEAR || — || align=right | 1.7 km || 
|-id=894 bgcolor=#fefefe
| 137894 ||  || — || January 3, 2000 || Socorro || LINEAR || — || align=right | 1.7 km || 
|-id=895 bgcolor=#fefefe
| 137895 ||  || — || January 6, 2000 || Socorro || LINEAR || NYS || align=right | 1.1 km || 
|-id=896 bgcolor=#E9E9E9
| 137896 ||  || — || January 8, 2000 || Socorro || LINEAR || — || align=right | 3.1 km || 
|-id=897 bgcolor=#fefefe
| 137897 ||  || — || January 7, 2000 || Socorro || LINEAR || — || align=right | 1.6 km || 
|-id=898 bgcolor=#fefefe
| 137898 ||  || — || January 7, 2000 || Socorro || LINEAR || — || align=right | 1.6 km || 
|-id=899 bgcolor=#fefefe
| 137899 ||  || — || January 8, 2000 || Socorro || LINEAR || PHO || align=right | 2.7 km || 
|-id=900 bgcolor=#fefefe
| 137900 ||  || — || January 8, 2000 || Socorro || LINEAR || — || align=right | 4.7 km || 
|}

137901–138000 

|-bgcolor=#E9E9E9
| 137901 ||  || — || January 12, 2000 || Višnjan Observatory || K. Korlević || — || align=right | 2.5 km || 
|-id=902 bgcolor=#E9E9E9
| 137902 ||  || — || January 6, 2000 || Kitt Peak || Spacewatch || — || align=right | 1.6 km || 
|-id=903 bgcolor=#fefefe
| 137903 ||  || — || January 7, 2000 || Kitt Peak || Spacewatch || — || align=right | 1.5 km || 
|-id=904 bgcolor=#fefefe
| 137904 ||  || — || January 8, 2000 || Kitt Peak || Spacewatch || NYS || align=right data-sort-value="0.90" | 900 m || 
|-id=905 bgcolor=#E9E9E9
| 137905 ||  || — || January 12, 2000 || Kitt Peak || Spacewatch || — || align=right | 1.7 km || 
|-id=906 bgcolor=#fefefe
| 137906 ||  || — || January 10, 2000 || Kitt Peak || Spacewatch || V || align=right | 1.4 km || 
|-id=907 bgcolor=#fefefe
| 137907 ||  || — || January 4, 2000 || Socorro || LINEAR || NYS || align=right | 1.0 km || 
|-id=908 bgcolor=#fefefe
| 137908 ||  || — || January 4, 2000 || Socorro || LINEAR || — || align=right | 1.3 km || 
|-id=909 bgcolor=#fefefe
| 137909 ||  || — || January 5, 2000 || Socorro || LINEAR || — || align=right | 1.8 km || 
|-id=910 bgcolor=#fefefe
| 137910 ||  || — || January 6, 2000 || Socorro || LINEAR || ERI || align=right | 2.8 km || 
|-id=911 bgcolor=#FFC2E0
| 137911 ||  || — || January 8, 2000 || Mauna Kea || D. J. Tholen, R. J. Whiteley || AMO +1km || align=right | 1.0 km || 
|-id=912 bgcolor=#fefefe
| 137912 ||  || — || January 4, 2000 || Socorro || LINEAR || FLO || align=right | 1.0 km || 
|-id=913 bgcolor=#E9E9E9
| 137913 ||  || — || January 27, 2000 || Oizumi || T. Kobayashi || — || align=right | 3.4 km || 
|-id=914 bgcolor=#fefefe
| 137914 ||  || — || January 29, 2000 || Socorro || LINEAR || — || align=right | 1.7 km || 
|-id=915 bgcolor=#fefefe
| 137915 ||  || — || January 29, 2000 || Socorro || LINEAR || — || align=right | 1.5 km || 
|-id=916 bgcolor=#fefefe
| 137916 ||  || — || January 28, 2000 || Kitt Peak || Spacewatch || — || align=right | 1.4 km || 
|-id=917 bgcolor=#E9E9E9
| 137917 ||  || — || January 28, 2000 || Kitt Peak || Spacewatch || — || align=right | 1.4 km || 
|-id=918 bgcolor=#fefefe
| 137918 ||  || — || January 29, 2000 || Kitt Peak || Spacewatch || — || align=right | 1.0 km || 
|-id=919 bgcolor=#E9E9E9
| 137919 ||  || — || January 28, 2000 || Uenohara || N. Kawasato || — || align=right | 3.4 km || 
|-id=920 bgcolor=#fefefe
| 137920 ||  || — || January 30, 2000 || Socorro || LINEAR || NYS || align=right | 1.4 km || 
|-id=921 bgcolor=#fefefe
| 137921 ||  || — || January 30, 2000 || Socorro || LINEAR || — || align=right | 1.7 km || 
|-id=922 bgcolor=#fefefe
| 137922 ||  || — || January 30, 2000 || Socorro || LINEAR || — || align=right | 1.3 km || 
|-id=923 bgcolor=#fefefe
| 137923 ||  || — || January 30, 2000 || Socorro || LINEAR || — || align=right | 1.6 km || 
|-id=924 bgcolor=#FFC2E0
| 137924 ||  || — || January 26, 2000 || Socorro || LINEAR || ATE +1km || align=right data-sort-value="0.97" | 970 m || 
|-id=925 bgcolor=#FFC2E0
| 137925 ||  || — || January 30, 2000 || Catalina || CSS || APO +1km || align=right | 1.4 km || 
|-id=926 bgcolor=#E9E9E9
| 137926 ||  || — || January 27, 2000 || Višnjan Observatory || K. Korlević || — || align=right | 1.7 km || 
|-id=927 bgcolor=#fefefe
| 137927 ||  || — || January 29, 2000 || Socorro || LINEAR || V || align=right | 1.3 km || 
|-id=928 bgcolor=#fefefe
| 137928 ||  || — || January 29, 2000 || Socorro || LINEAR || — || align=right | 1.9 km || 
|-id=929 bgcolor=#fefefe
| 137929 ||  || — || January 30, 2000 || Socorro || LINEAR || NYS || align=right | 1.3 km || 
|-id=930 bgcolor=#fefefe
| 137930 ||  || — || January 30, 2000 || Socorro || LINEAR || NYS || align=right | 1.5 km || 
|-id=931 bgcolor=#fefefe
| 137931 ||  || — || January 30, 2000 || Socorro || LINEAR || NYS || align=right | 1.5 km || 
|-id=932 bgcolor=#fefefe
| 137932 ||  || — || January 30, 2000 || Socorro || LINEAR || NYS || align=right | 1.2 km || 
|-id=933 bgcolor=#fefefe
| 137933 ||  || — || January 28, 2000 || Kitt Peak || Spacewatch || NYS || align=right | 1.0 km || 
|-id=934 bgcolor=#E9E9E9
| 137934 ||  || — || January 28, 2000 || Kitt Peak || Spacewatch || — || align=right | 2.8 km || 
|-id=935 bgcolor=#fefefe
| 137935 ||  || — || January 28, 2000 || Kitt Peak || Spacewatch || MAS || align=right | 1.4 km || 
|-id=936 bgcolor=#fefefe
| 137936 ||  || — || January 30, 2000 || Kitt Peak || Spacewatch || NYS || align=right | 1.4 km || 
|-id=937 bgcolor=#E9E9E9
| 137937 ||  || — || January 30, 2000 || Catalina || CSS || — || align=right | 2.3 km || 
|-id=938 bgcolor=#fefefe
| 137938 ||  || — || January 30, 2000 || Socorro || LINEAR || NYS || align=right | 3.3 km || 
|-id=939 bgcolor=#fefefe
| 137939 ||  || — || January 31, 2000 || Socorro || LINEAR || — || align=right | 1.6 km || 
|-id=940 bgcolor=#fefefe
| 137940 ||  || — || January 26, 2000 || Kitt Peak || Spacewatch || — || align=right | 1.3 km || 
|-id=941 bgcolor=#fefefe
| 137941 ||  || — || January 27, 2000 || Kitt Peak || Spacewatch || MAS || align=right | 1.4 km || 
|-id=942 bgcolor=#fefefe
| 137942 ||  || — || January 30, 2000 || Socorro || LINEAR || — || align=right | 2.0 km || 
|-id=943 bgcolor=#fefefe
| 137943 ||  || — || January 26, 2000 || Kitt Peak || Spacewatch || — || align=right | 1.2 km || 
|-id=944 bgcolor=#fefefe
| 137944 ||  || — || January 27, 2000 || Kitt Peak || Spacewatch || NYS || align=right data-sort-value="0.96" | 960 m || 
|-id=945 bgcolor=#fefefe
| 137945 ||  || — || January 27, 2000 || Kitt Peak || Spacewatch || MAS || align=right | 1.2 km || 
|-id=946 bgcolor=#fefefe
| 137946 ||  || — || January 30, 2000 || Socorro || LINEAR || — || align=right | 1.3 km || 
|-id=947 bgcolor=#fefefe
| 137947 ||  || — || February 4, 2000 || Višnjan Observatory || K. Korlević || NYS || align=right | 1.2 km || 
|-id=948 bgcolor=#fefefe
| 137948 ||  || — || February 2, 2000 || Socorro || LINEAR || FLO || align=right | 1.4 km || 
|-id=949 bgcolor=#fefefe
| 137949 ||  || — || February 2, 2000 || Socorro || LINEAR || V || align=right | 1.2 km || 
|-id=950 bgcolor=#fefefe
| 137950 ||  || — || February 2, 2000 || Socorro || LINEAR || — || align=right | 1.6 km || 
|-id=951 bgcolor=#fefefe
| 137951 ||  || — || February 2, 2000 || Socorro || LINEAR || — || align=right | 4.5 km || 
|-id=952 bgcolor=#fefefe
| 137952 ||  || — || February 2, 2000 || Socorro || LINEAR || NYS || align=right | 1.1 km || 
|-id=953 bgcolor=#fefefe
| 137953 ||  || — || February 2, 2000 || Socorro || LINEAR || — || align=right | 1.9 km || 
|-id=954 bgcolor=#C2FFFF
| 137954 ||  || — || February 2, 2000 || Socorro || LINEAR || L4 || align=right | 11 km || 
|-id=955 bgcolor=#fefefe
| 137955 ||  || — || February 2, 2000 || Socorro || LINEAR || NYS || align=right | 1.2 km || 
|-id=956 bgcolor=#fefefe
| 137956 ||  || — || February 2, 2000 || Socorro || LINEAR || NYS || align=right | 1.6 km || 
|-id=957 bgcolor=#fefefe
| 137957 ||  || — || February 2, 2000 || Socorro || LINEAR || NYS || align=right | 1.1 km || 
|-id=958 bgcolor=#fefefe
| 137958 ||  || — || February 2, 2000 || Socorro || LINEAR || — || align=right | 3.3 km || 
|-id=959 bgcolor=#E9E9E9
| 137959 ||  || — || February 2, 2000 || Socorro || LINEAR || — || align=right | 2.4 km || 
|-id=960 bgcolor=#fefefe
| 137960 ||  || — || February 2, 2000 || Socorro || LINEAR || MAS || align=right | 1.2 km || 
|-id=961 bgcolor=#fefefe
| 137961 ||  || — || February 2, 2000 || Socorro || LINEAR || — || align=right | 1.9 km || 
|-id=962 bgcolor=#E9E9E9
| 137962 ||  || — || February 2, 2000 || Socorro || LINEAR || — || align=right | 2.5 km || 
|-id=963 bgcolor=#fefefe
| 137963 ||  || — || February 2, 2000 || Socorro || LINEAR || — || align=right | 2.2 km || 
|-id=964 bgcolor=#E9E9E9
| 137964 ||  || — || February 2, 2000 || Socorro || LINEAR || — || align=right | 2.8 km || 
|-id=965 bgcolor=#fefefe
| 137965 ||  || — || February 2, 2000 || Socorro || LINEAR || NYS || align=right | 1.3 km || 
|-id=966 bgcolor=#fefefe
| 137966 ||  || — || February 2, 2000 || Socorro || LINEAR || ERI || align=right | 5.1 km || 
|-id=967 bgcolor=#E9E9E9
| 137967 ||  || — || February 2, 2000 || Socorro || LINEAR || — || align=right | 2.6 km || 
|-id=968 bgcolor=#E9E9E9
| 137968 ||  || — || February 2, 2000 || Socorro || LINEAR || — || align=right | 1.5 km || 
|-id=969 bgcolor=#fefefe
| 137969 ||  || — || February 2, 2000 || Socorro || LINEAR || NYS || align=right | 1.1 km || 
|-id=970 bgcolor=#E9E9E9
| 137970 ||  || — || February 4, 2000 || Višnjan Observatory || K. Korlević || — || align=right | 2.0 km || 
|-id=971 bgcolor=#fefefe
| 137971 ||  || — || February 5, 2000 || Višnjan Observatory || K. Korlević || — || align=right | 1.8 km || 
|-id=972 bgcolor=#fefefe
| 137972 ||  || — || February 2, 2000 || Socorro || LINEAR || H || align=right | 1.2 km || 
|-id=973 bgcolor=#fefefe
| 137973 ||  || — || February 4, 2000 || Socorro || LINEAR || H || align=right | 1.0 km || 
|-id=974 bgcolor=#fefefe
| 137974 ||  || — || February 7, 2000 || Ondřejov || P. Kušnirák || — || align=right | 1.7 km || 
|-id=975 bgcolor=#fefefe
| 137975 ||  || — || February 2, 2000 || Socorro || LINEAR || FLO || align=right | 1.1 km || 
|-id=976 bgcolor=#fefefe
| 137976 ||  || — || February 2, 2000 || Socorro || LINEAR || V || align=right | 1.3 km || 
|-id=977 bgcolor=#d6d6d6
| 137977 ||  || — || February 2, 2000 || Socorro || LINEAR || — || align=right | 4.7 km || 
|-id=978 bgcolor=#fefefe
| 137978 ||  || — || February 2, 2000 || Socorro || LINEAR || NYS || align=right | 1.1 km || 
|-id=979 bgcolor=#E9E9E9
| 137979 ||  || — || February 2, 2000 || Socorro || LINEAR || — || align=right | 2.6 km || 
|-id=980 bgcolor=#E9E9E9
| 137980 ||  || — || February 2, 2000 || Socorro || LINEAR || — || align=right | 1.7 km || 
|-id=981 bgcolor=#E9E9E9
| 137981 ||  || — || February 2, 2000 || Socorro || LINEAR || — || align=right | 1.6 km || 
|-id=982 bgcolor=#E9E9E9
| 137982 ||  || — || February 2, 2000 || Socorro || LINEAR || — || align=right | 2.3 km || 
|-id=983 bgcolor=#E9E9E9
| 137983 ||  || — || February 2, 2000 || Socorro || LINEAR || GER || align=right | 3.2 km || 
|-id=984 bgcolor=#E9E9E9
| 137984 ||  || — || February 4, 2000 || Socorro || LINEAR || — || align=right | 4.7 km || 
|-id=985 bgcolor=#E9E9E9
| 137985 ||  || — || February 4, 2000 || Socorro || LINEAR || ADE || align=right | 6.0 km || 
|-id=986 bgcolor=#fefefe
| 137986 ||  || — || February 2, 2000 || Socorro || LINEAR || ERI || align=right | 3.6 km || 
|-id=987 bgcolor=#E9E9E9
| 137987 ||  || — || February 2, 2000 || Socorro || LINEAR || RAF || align=right | 1.9 km || 
|-id=988 bgcolor=#E9E9E9
| 137988 ||  || — || February 2, 2000 || Socorro || LINEAR || — || align=right | 2.7 km || 
|-id=989 bgcolor=#fefefe
| 137989 ||  || — || February 2, 2000 || Socorro || LINEAR || — || align=right | 3.0 km || 
|-id=990 bgcolor=#fefefe
| 137990 ||  || — || February 2, 2000 || Socorro || LINEAR || — || align=right | 2.4 km || 
|-id=991 bgcolor=#E9E9E9
| 137991 ||  || — || February 3, 2000 || Socorro || LINEAR || — || align=right | 1.8 km || 
|-id=992 bgcolor=#fefefe
| 137992 ||  || — || February 6, 2000 || Socorro || LINEAR || NYS || align=right | 1.1 km || 
|-id=993 bgcolor=#fefefe
| 137993 ||  || — || February 6, 2000 || Socorro || LINEAR || — || align=right | 1.4 km || 
|-id=994 bgcolor=#fefefe
| 137994 ||  || — || February 6, 2000 || Socorro || LINEAR || MAS || align=right | 1.3 km || 
|-id=995 bgcolor=#E9E9E9
| 137995 ||  || — || February 8, 2000 || Kitt Peak || Spacewatch || — || align=right | 1.8 km || 
|-id=996 bgcolor=#fefefe
| 137996 ||  || — || February 7, 2000 || Kitt Peak || Spacewatch || NYS || align=right | 1.2 km || 
|-id=997 bgcolor=#fefefe
| 137997 ||  || — || February 7, 2000 || Kitt Peak || Spacewatch || NYS || align=right | 1.1 km || 
|-id=998 bgcolor=#E9E9E9
| 137998 ||  || — || February 4, 2000 || Socorro || LINEAR || GER || align=right | 3.5 km || 
|-id=999 bgcolor=#fefefe
| 137999 ||  || — || February 4, 2000 || Socorro || LINEAR || — || align=right | 2.3 km || 
|-id=000 bgcolor=#fefefe
| 138000 ||  || — || February 4, 2000 || Socorro || LINEAR || NYS || align=right | 1.9 km || 
|}

References

External links 
 Discovery Circumstances: Numbered Minor Planets (135001)–(140000) (IAU Minor Planet Center)

0137